This is a partial list of unnumbered minor planets for principal provisional designations assigned between 1 August and 15 September 2000. , a total of 461 bodies remain unnumbered for this period. Objects for this year are listed on the following pages: A–E · F–O · P–R · S–T and U–Y. Also see previous and next year.

P 

|- id="2000 PN" bgcolor=#FFC2E0
| – || 2000 PN || APO || 22.5 || data-sort-value="0.11" | 110 m || single || 2 days || 03 Aug 2000 || 22 || align=left | Disc.: LINEAR || 
|- id="2000 PE3" bgcolor=#FFC2E0
| 0 ||  || APO || 20.50 || data-sort-value="0.28" | 280 m || multiple || 2000–2021 || 11 Sep 2021 || 134 || align=left | Disc.: LINEAR || 
|- id="2000 PF3" bgcolor=#FA8072
| 1 ||  || MCA || 17.6 || data-sort-value="0.90" | 900 m || multiple || 2000–2020 || 23 Dec 2020 || 185 || align=left | Disc.: LINEARAlt.: 2010 LZ65 || 
|- id="2000 PS3" bgcolor=#fefefe
| 1 ||  || MBA-I || 17.1 || 1.1 km || multiple || 2000–2021 || 17 Jan 2021 || 154 || align=left | Disc.: LINEAR || 
|- id="2000 PF5" bgcolor=#FFC2E0
| 4 ||  || AMO || 20.3 || data-sort-value="0.31" | 310 m || single || 66 days || 06 Oct 2000 || 139 || align=left | Disc.: LINEAR || 
|- id="2000 PY5" bgcolor=#FFC2E0
| 6 ||  || APO || 21.1 || data-sort-value="0.21" | 210 m || single || 31 days || 02 Sep 2000 || 43 || align=left | Disc.: LINEARPotentially hazardous object || 
|- id="2000 PZ5" bgcolor=#FA8072
| 0 ||  || MCA || 17.61 || 1.7 km || multiple || 2000–2020 || 26 Jan 2020 || 427 || align=left | Disc.: LINEAR || 
|- id="2000 PK6" bgcolor=#FA8072
| 1 ||  || MCA || 18.2 || data-sort-value="0.96" | 960 m || multiple || 2000–2017 || 23 Jun 2017 || 48 || align=left | Disc.: AMOS || 
|- id="2000 PW7" bgcolor=#FA8072
| 1 ||  || MCA || 18.0 || data-sort-value="0.75" | 750 m || multiple || 2000–2018 || 12 Apr 2018 || 127 || align=left | Disc.: LINEARAlt.: 2015 TG201 || 
|- id="2000 PH8" bgcolor=#FFC2E0
| 7 ||  || AMO || 24.3 || data-sort-value="0.049" | 49 m || single || 6 days || 09 Aug 2000 || 22 || align=left | Disc.: Spacewatch || 
|- id="2000 PL8" bgcolor=#FA8072
| 0 ||  || MCA || 1.1 || 2.1 km || multiple || 1989–2022 || 09 Jul 2022 || 122 || align=left | Disc.: LINEARAlt.: 2011 LW19 || 
|- id="2000 PN8" bgcolor=#FFC2E0
| 0 ||  || APO || 22.04 || data-sort-value="0.14" | 140 m || multiple || 2000–2021 || 17 Aug 2021 || 166 || align=left | Disc.: AMOS || 
|- id="2000 PP9" bgcolor=#FFC2E0
| 0 ||  || AMO || 19.1 || data-sort-value="0.54" | 540 m || multiple || 2000–2014 || 18 May 2014 || 195 || align=left | Disc.: LINEARPotentially hazardous object || 
|- id="2000 PA13" bgcolor=#FA8072
| 0 ||  || MCA || 17.21 || 1.5 km || multiple || 2000–2021 || 17 Dec 2021 || 225 || align=left | Disc.: LINEAR || 
|- id="2000 PX21" bgcolor=#FA8072
| 0 ||  || MCA || 18.1 || data-sort-value="0.71" | 710 m || multiple || 1996–2020 || 14 Jun 2020 || 118 || align=left | Disc.: LINEAR || 
|- id="2000 PM25" bgcolor=#d6d6d6
| 1 ||  || MBA-O || 16.6 || 2.7 km || multiple || 2000–2016 || 28 Jul 2016 || 29 || align=left | Disc.: LINEAR || 
|- id="2000 PQ27" bgcolor=#FFC2E0
| 0 ||  || AMO || 20.0 || data-sort-value="0.36" | 360 m || multiple || 2000–2021 || 09 Jan 2021 || 535 || align=left | Disc.: Spacewatch || 
|- id="2000 PS28" bgcolor=#E9E9E9
| 1 ||  || MBA-M || 17.3 || 1.5 km || multiple || 2000–2020 || 29 Jan 2020 || 142 || align=left | Disc.: Berg. GladbachAdded on 17 January 2021Alt.: 2018 VC35 || 
|- id="2000 PU29" bgcolor=#C2E0FF
| 5 ||  || TNO || 8.08 || 80 km || multiple || 1999–2021 || 12 Sep 2021 || 19 || align=left | Disc.: Mauna Kea Obs.LoUTNOs, cubewano (cold) || 
|- id="2000 PW29" bgcolor=#C2E0FF
| 4 ||  || TNO || 8.3 || 73 km || multiple || 1999–2001 || 20 Sep 2001 || 14 || align=left | Disc.: Mauna Kea Obs.LoUTNOs, cubewano (cold) || 
|- id="2000 PX29" bgcolor=#C2E0FF
| 4 ||  || TNO || 7.6 || 155 km || multiple || 2000–2019 || 04 Sep 2019 || 28 || align=left | Disc.: Mauna Kea Obs.LoUTNOs, cubewano (hot) || 
|- id="2000 PY29" bgcolor=#C2E0FF
| 3 ||  || TNO || 7.3 || 115 km || multiple || 2000–2012 || 11 Oct 2012 || 22 || align=left | Disc.: Mauna Kea Obs.LoUTNOs, cubewano (cold) || 
|- id="2000 PZ29" bgcolor=#C2E0FF
| E ||  || TNO || 7.5 || 109 km || single || 1 day || 06 Aug 2000 || 6 || align=left | Disc.: Mauna Kea Obs.LoUTNOs, cubewano? || 
|- id="2000 PA30" bgcolor=#C2E0FF
| 3 ||  || TNO || 8.0 || 83 km || multiple || 1999–2014 || 03 Sep 2014 || 18 || align=left | Disc.: Mauna Kea Obs.LoUTNOs, cubewano (cold) || 
|- id="2000 PB30" bgcolor=#C2E0FF
| E ||  || TNO || 8.1 || 82 km || single || 1 day || 06 Aug 2000 || 6 || align=left | Disc.: Mauna Kea Obs.LoUTNOs, cubewano? || 
|- id="2000 PC30" bgcolor=#C2E0FF
| 3 ||  || TNO || 7.6 || 100 km || multiple || 1999–2019 || 04 Sep 2019 || 24 || align=left | Disc.: Mauna Kea Obs.LoUTNOs, cubewano (cold) || 
|- id="2000 PD30" bgcolor=#C2E0FF
| 3 ||  || TNO || 7.0 || 132 km || multiple || 1999–2014 || 26 Sep 2014 || 40 || align=left | Disc.: Mauna Kea Obs.LoUTNOs, cubewano (cold) || 
|- id="2000 PF30" bgcolor=#C2E0FF
| 3 ||  || TNO || 7.9 || 99 km || multiple || 1999–2006 || 16 Apr 2006 || 27 || align=left | Disc.: Mauna Kea Obs.LoUTNOs, SDOAlt.: 1999 OL4 || 
|- id="2000 PG30" bgcolor=#C2E0FF
| 3 ||  || TNO || 7.7 || 96 km || multiple || 1999–2020 || 21 Sep 2020 || 20 || align=left | Disc.: Mauna Kea Obs.LoUTNOs, cubewano (cold) || 
|- id="2000 PH30" bgcolor=#C2E0FF
| 2 ||  || TNO || 7.8 || 104 km || multiple || 2000–2020 || 12 Aug 2020 || 23 || align=left | Disc.: Mauna Kea Obs.LoUTNOs, SDO || 
|- id="2000 PL30" bgcolor=#C2E0FF
| 4 ||  || TNO || 7.4 || 138 km || multiple || 2000–2019 || 04 Sep 2019 || 18 || align=left | Disc.: Mauna Kea Obs.LoUTNOs, other TNO || 
|- id="2000 PM30" bgcolor=#C2E0FF
| 3 ||  || TNO || 7.9 || 87 km || multiple || 1999–2019 || 04 Sep 2019 || 22 || align=left | Disc.: Mauna Kea Obs.LoUTNOs, cubewano (cold) || 
|- id="2000 PN30" bgcolor=#C2E0FF
| 3 ||  || TNO || 8.1 || 80 km || multiple || 1999–2012 || 11 Oct 2012 || 24 || align=left | Disc.: Mauna Kea Obs.LoUTNOs, cubewano (cold) || 
|- id="2000 PQ30" bgcolor=#C2E0FF
| 6 ||  || TNO || 8.6 || 63 km || multiple || 2000–2015 || 28 May 2015 || 11 || align=left | Disc.: La Silla Obs.LoUTNOs, cubewano (cold) || 
|- id="2000 PR30" bgcolor=#C2E0FF
| E ||  || TNO || 8.1 || 82 km || single || 1 day || 08 Aug 2000 || 6 || align=left | Disc.: La Silla Obs.LoUTNOs, cubewano? || 
|- id="2000 PS30" bgcolor=#C2E0FF
| E ||  || TNO || 8.8 || 66 km || single || 1 day || 08 Aug 2000 || 6 || align=left | Disc.: La Silla Obs.LoUTNOs, SDO || 
|- id="2000 PX30" bgcolor=#E9E9E9
| 0 ||  || MBA-M || 17.9 || 1.1 km || multiple || 2000–2021 || 08 Jun 2021 || 43 || align=left | Disc.: Cerro Tololo || 
|- id="2000 PB31" bgcolor=#fefefe
| 0 ||  || MBA-I || 17.9 || data-sort-value="0.78" | 780 m || multiple || 2000–2021 || 17 Jan 2021 || 97 || align=left | Disc.: Cerro TololoAlt.: 2016 WG39 || 
|- id="2000 PU32" bgcolor=#fefefe
| 0 ||  || MBA-I || 18.28 || data-sort-value="0.66" | 660 m || multiple || 2000–2021 || 10 May 2021 || 92 || align=left | Disc.: Cerro Tololo || 
|- id="2000 PV32" bgcolor=#d6d6d6
| 0 ||  || MBA-O || 15.81 || 3.8 km || multiple || 2000–2021 || 06 Apr 2021 || 135 || align=left | Disc.: SpacewatchAlt.: 2010 AG151, 2010 MG108 || 
|- id="2000 PW32" bgcolor=#d6d6d6
| 0 ||  || MBA-O || 17.13 || 2.1 km || multiple || 2000–2021 || 10 Aug 2021 || 76 || align=left | Disc.: Cerro Tololo || 
|- id="2000 PY32" bgcolor=#d6d6d6
| 0 ||  || MBA-O || 16.62 || 2.6 km || multiple || 2000–2021 || 11 May 2021 || 76 || align=left | Disc.: Cerro Tololo || 
|- id="2000 PZ32" bgcolor=#E9E9E9
| 0 ||  || MBA-M || 18.18 || data-sort-value="0.69" | 690 m || multiple || 2000–2021 || 27 Nov 2021 || 115 || align=left | Disc.: Cerro Tololo || 
|- id="2000 PA33" bgcolor=#E9E9E9
| 0 ||  || MBA-M || 17.3 || 1.9 km || multiple || 2000–2019 || 03 Oct 2019 || 68 || align=left | Disc.: Spacewatch || 
|- id="2000 PB33" bgcolor=#d6d6d6
| 0 ||  || MBA-O || 16.0 || 3.5 km || multiple || 2000–2021 || 08 Jun 2021 || 74 || align=left | Disc.: Cerro Tololo || 
|- id="2000 PC33" bgcolor=#fefefe
| 0 ||  || MBA-I || 18.1 || data-sort-value="0.71" | 710 m || multiple || 2000–2019 || 29 Sep 2019 || 47 || align=left | Disc.: Cerro Tololo || 
|- id="2000 PD33" bgcolor=#fefefe
| 0 ||  || MBA-I || 18.6 || data-sort-value="0.57" | 570 m || multiple || 2000–2016 || 03 Aug 2016 || 49 || align=left | Disc.: Cerro Tololo || 
|- id="2000 PE33" bgcolor=#E9E9E9
| 0 ||  || MBA-M || 17.8 || 1.2 km || multiple || 2000–2020 || 12 Apr 2020 || 83 || align=left | Disc.: Cerro Tololo || 
|- id="2000 PF33" bgcolor=#E9E9E9
| 0 ||  || MBA-M || 17.90 || data-sort-value="0.78" | 780 m || multiple || 2000–2021 || 06 Oct 2021 || 76 || align=left | Disc.: Cerro Tololo || 
|- id="2000 PJ33" bgcolor=#fefefe
| 0 ||  || MBA-I || 18.49 || data-sort-value="0.60" | 600 m || multiple || 2000–2021 || 09 Oct 2021 || 55 || align=left | Disc.: Spacewatch || 
|- id="2000 PK33" bgcolor=#fefefe
| 0 ||  || MBA-I || 18.0 || data-sort-value="0.75" | 750 m || multiple || 2000–2019 || 20 Dec 2019 || 82 || align=left | Disc.: Cerro Tololo || 
|- id="2000 PL33" bgcolor=#E9E9E9
| 0 ||  || MBA-M || 17.82 || 1.1 km || multiple || 2000–2021 || 08 Jul 2021 || 85 || align=left | Disc.: Cerro Tololo || 
|- id="2000 PN33" bgcolor=#E9E9E9
| 1 ||  || MBA-M || 18.2 || data-sort-value="0.68" | 680 m || multiple || 2000–2019 || 04 Feb 2019 || 88 || align=left | Disc.: Cerro Tololo || 
|- id="2000 PO33" bgcolor=#d6d6d6
| 0 ||  || MBA-O || 17.35 || 1.9 km || multiple || 2000–2021 || 05 Aug 2021 || 51 || align=left | Disc.: Cerro Tololo || 
|- id="2000 PQ33" bgcolor=#d6d6d6
| 1 ||  || MBA-O || 17.1 || 2.1 km || multiple || 2000–2019 || 04 Feb 2019 || 37 || align=left | Disc.: Cerro Tololo || 
|- id="2000 PR33" bgcolor=#E9E9E9
| 0 ||  || MBA-M || 17.6 || 1.3 km || multiple || 2000–2021 || 07 Jun 2021 || 55 || align=left | Disc.: Cerro Tololo || 
|- id="2000 PU33" bgcolor=#d6d6d6
| 0 ||  || MBA-O || 16.89 || 2.3 km || multiple || 1995–2021 || 11 Jun 2021 || 91 || align=left | Disc.: SpacewatchAlt.: 1995 UL77 || 
|- id="2000 PV33" bgcolor=#fefefe
| 0 ||  || MBA-I || 19.1 || data-sort-value="0.45" | 450 m || multiple || 2000–2019 || 03 Oct 2019 || 43 || align=left | Disc.: Cerro Tololo || 
|- id="2000 PW33" bgcolor=#d6d6d6
| 0 ||  || MBA-O || 16.8 || 2.4 km || multiple || 2000–2020 || 04 Nov 2020 || 108 || align=left | Disc.: Spacewatch || 
|- id="2000 PX33" bgcolor=#E9E9E9
| 0 ||  || MBA-M || 17.72 || data-sort-value="0.85" | 850 m || multiple || 2000–2021 || 25 Nov 2021 || 133 || align=left | Disc.: AMOS || 
|- id="2000 PY33" bgcolor=#d6d6d6
| 0 ||  || MBA-O || 16.7 || 2.5 km || multiple || 2000–2021 || 18 Jan 2021 || 30 || align=left | Disc.: Cerro Tololo || 
|- id="2000 PZ33" bgcolor=#fefefe
| 0 ||  || MBA-I || 18.94 || data-sort-value="0.48" | 480 m || multiple || 2000–2020 || 22 Mar 2020 || 67 || align=left | Disc.: Cerro Tololo || 
|- id="2000 PA34" bgcolor=#E9E9E9
| 0 ||  || MBA-M || 17.7 || 1.6 km || multiple || 2000–2019 || 28 Nov 2019 || 42 || align=left | Disc.: Cerro Tololo || 
|- id="2000 PB34" bgcolor=#fefefe
| 1 ||  || HUN || 19.2 || data-sort-value="0.43" | 430 m || multiple || 2000–2020 || 23 Jan 2020 || 33 || align=left | Disc.: Cerro Tololo || 
|- id="2000 PC34" bgcolor=#fefefe
| 2 ||  || MBA-I || 18.3 || data-sort-value="0.65" | 650 m || multiple || 2000–2021 || 18 Jan 2021 || 49 || align=left | Disc.: Cerro Tololo || 
|- id="2000 PE34" bgcolor=#fefefe
| 1 ||  || MBA-I || 18.72 || data-sort-value="0.54" | 540 m || multiple || 2000–2021 || 13 May 2021 || 64 || align=left | Disc.: Cerro TololoAdded on 19 October 2020 || 
|- id="2000 PF34" bgcolor=#fefefe
| 3 ||  || MBA-I || 19.6 || data-sort-value="0.36" | 360 m || multiple || 2000–2015 || 23 Oct 2015 || 16 || align=left | Disc.: Cerro TololoAdded on 19 October 2020 || 
|}
back to top

Q 

|- id="2000 QC7" bgcolor=#E9E9E9
| 0 ||  || MBA-M || 16.80 || 1.3 km || multiple || 2000–2021 || 19 Nov 2021 || 273 || align=left | Disc.: LINEAR || 
|- id="2000 QS7" bgcolor=#FFC2E0
| 0 ||  || APO || 19.69 || data-sort-value="0.45" | 430 m || multiple || 2000–2022 || 12 Jun 2022 || 75 || align=left | Disc.: LINEARPotentially hazardous object || 
|- id="2000 QT7" bgcolor=#FFC2E0
| 0 ||  || AMO || 20.27 || data-sort-value="0.31" | 310 m || multiple || 2000–2021 || 02 Nov 2021 || 266 || align=left | Disc.: LINEAR || 
|- id="2000 QV7" bgcolor=#FFC2E0
| 0 ||  || APO || 21.55 || data-sort-value="0.17" | 170 m || multiple || 2000–2022 || 02 Jan 2022 || 177 || align=left | Disc.: LINEARPotentially hazardous object || 
|- id="2000 QL19" bgcolor=#E9E9E9
| 0 ||  = (619208) || MBA-M || 17.0 || 1.7 km || multiple || 2000–2020 || 28 Feb 2020 || 59 || align=left | Disc.: LINEARAlt.: 2015 BW14 || 
|- id="2000 QC34" bgcolor=#FA8072
| 2 ||  || MCA || 18.7 || 1.0 km || multiple || 2000–2011 || 27 Nov 2011 || 90 || align=left | Disc.: LINEAR || 
|- id="2000 QO38" bgcolor=#fefefe
| 0 ||  || MBA-I || 17.76 || data-sort-value="0.83" | 830 m || multiple || 1993–2021 || 17 Apr 2021 || 86 || align=left | Disc.: LINEARAlt.: 2004 TQ238 || 
|- id="2000 QB56" bgcolor=#FA8072
| 1 ||  || MCA || 18.4 || data-sort-value="0.62" | 620 m || multiple || 2000–2020 || 16 May 2020 || 143 || align=left | Disc.: LINEAR || 
|- id="2000 QT69" bgcolor=#E9E9E9
| 0 ||  || MBA-M || 18.22 || data-sort-value="0.95" | 950 m || multiple || 2000–2021 || 27 Nov 2021 || 119 || align=left | Disc.: Spacewatch || 
|- id="2000 QU69" bgcolor=#d6d6d6
| 0 ||  || MBA-O || 17.6 || 1.7 km || multiple || 2000–2019 || 26 Sep 2019 || 44 || align=left | Disc.: SpacewatchAlt.: 2014 QP66 || 
|- id="2000 QX69" bgcolor=#FFC2E0
| 9 ||  || APO || 24.2 || data-sort-value="0.051" | 51 m || single || 5 days || 02 Sep 2000 || 29 || align=left | Disc.: LINEAR || 
|- id="2000 QL74" bgcolor=#fefefe
| 0 ||  || MBA-I || 18.31 || data-sort-value="0.65" | 650 m || multiple || 2000–2021 || 11 Jul 2021 || 121 || align=left | Disc.: LINEARAlt.: 2018 ST7 || 
|- id="2000 QD79" bgcolor=#E9E9E9
| 2 ||  || MBA-M || 17.6 || 1.3 km || multiple || 2000–2019 || 08 Jan 2019 || 81 || align=left | Disc.: LINEARAlt.: 2013 PH20 || 
|- id="2000 QM106" bgcolor=#fefefe
| 0 ||  || MBA-I || 17.81 || data-sort-value="0.75" | 900 m || multiple || 2000-2022 || 06 Aug 2022 || 65 || align=left | Disc.: LINEAR || 
|- id="2000 QV107" bgcolor=#E9E9E9
| 0 ||  || MBA-M || 17.80 || data-sort-value="0.82" | 820 m || multiple || 2000–2022 || 06 Jan 2022 || 126 || align=left | Disc.: LINEAR || 
|- id="2000 QM109" bgcolor=#E9E9E9
| 0 ||  || MBA-M || 18.0 || 1.4 km || multiple || 2000–2019 || 24 Dec 2019 || 59 || align=left | Disc.: SpacewatchAlt.: 2014 QS235 || 
|- id="2000 QQ109" bgcolor=#d6d6d6
| 0 ||  = (619209) || MBA-O || 16.4 || 2.9 km || multiple || 2000–2020 || 17 May 2020 || 55 || align=left | Disc.: Spacewatch || 
|- id="2000 QF111" bgcolor=#fefefe
| 0 ||  || MBA-I || 17.99 || data-sort-value="0.75" | 750 m || multiple || 2000–2021 || 08 Dec 2021 || 122 || align=left | Disc.: LINEAR || 
|- id="2000 QA115" bgcolor=#FA8072
| 0 ||  || MCA || 18.45 || data-sort-value="0.61" | 610 m || multiple || 2000–2021 || 27 Nov 2021 || 270 || align=left | Disc.: LINEARAlt.: 2007 RR140 || 
|- id="2000 QW115" bgcolor=#fefefe
| 0 ||  || MBA-I || 18.0 || data-sort-value="0.75" | 750 m || multiple || 2000–2019 || 04 Jul 2019 || 62 || align=left | Disc.: LINEARAdded on 11 May 2021Alt.: 2010 VU136 || 
|- id="2000 QN129" bgcolor=#FA8072
| 0 ||  || MCA || 18.3 || data-sort-value="0.65" | 650 m || multiple || 2000–2020 || 15 Dec 2020 || 129 || align=left | Disc.: Višnjan Obs. || 
|- id="2000 QB130" bgcolor=#E9E9E9
| 0 ||  || MBA-M || 17.3 || 1.9 km || multiple || 2000–2020 || 31 Jan 2020 || 87 || align=left | Disc.: LINEARAlt.: 2014 QM295 || 
|- id="2000 QJ130" bgcolor=#FFC2E0
| 1 ||  || AMO || 19.4 || data-sort-value="0.47" | 470 m || multiple || 2000–2012 || 16 Nov 2012 || 135 || align=left | Disc.: LINEAR || 
|- id="2000 QL130" bgcolor=#FFC2E0
| 4 ||  || AMO || 19.9 || data-sort-value="0.37" | 370 m || single || 92 days || 01 Dec 2000 || 45 || align=left | Disc.: LINEAR || 
|- id="2000 QM130" bgcolor=#FA8072
| – ||  || MCA || 19.2 || data-sort-value="0.43" | 430 m || single || 5 days || 05 Sep 2000 || 35 || align=left | Disc.: LINEAR || 
|- id="2000 QO130" bgcolor=#FFC2E0
| 4 ||  || AMO || 20.5 || data-sort-value="0.28" | 280 m || single || 92 days || 01 Dec 2000 || 71 || align=left | Disc.: LINEAR || 
|- id="2000 QS130" bgcolor=#E9E9E9
| 0 ||  || MBA-M || 17.3 || 1.5 km || multiple || 2000–2020 || 19 Apr 2020 || 104 || align=left | Disc.: Prescott Obs.Alt.: 2007 ED225, 2009 SH164, 2009 ST262, 2015 BG516, 2016 GE55 || 
|- id="2000 QF144" bgcolor=#E9E9E9
| 0 ||  || MBA-M || 17.42 || 1.4 km || multiple || 2000–2021 || 03 May 2021 || 86 || align=left | Disc.: LINEAR || 
|- id="2000 QB148" bgcolor=#E9E9E9
| 0 ||  || MBA-M || 17.47 || 1.3 km || multiple || 2000–2021 || 23 Oct 2021 || 111 || align=left | Disc.: LINEARAdded on 21 August 2021Alt.: 2015 DG296 || 
|- id="2000 QE148" bgcolor=#fefefe
| 0 ||  || MBA-I || 17.8 || data-sort-value="0.82" | 820 m || multiple || 2000–2019 || 31 Jul 2019 || 59 || align=left | Disc.: Spacewatch || 
|- id="2000 QM174" bgcolor=#fefefe
| 0 ||  || MBA-I || 17.31 || 1.0 km || multiple || 1999–2021 || 17 Jun 2021 || 211 || align=left | Disc.: LINEARAlt.: 2003 KY36, 2007 VW35, 2010 GA121, 2018 SC12 || 
|- id="2000 QW179" bgcolor=#E9E9E9
| 0 ||  || MBA-M || 17.26 || 2.0 km || multiple || 2000–2022 || 25 Jan 2022 || 105 || align=left | Disc.: SpacewatchAlt.: 2014 PM22 || 
|- id="2000 QM199" bgcolor=#E9E9E9
| 1 ||  || MBA-M || 17.2 || 2.0 km || multiple || 2000–2020 || 27 Jan 2020 || 56 || align=left | Disc.: LINEAR || 
|- id="2000 QC210" bgcolor=#FA8072
| 1 ||  || MCA || 18.4 || data-sort-value="0.62" | 620 m || multiple || 2000–2020 || 21 Apr 2020 || 58 || align=left | Disc.: LINEARAlt.: 2000 RX59 || 
|- id="2000 QR210" bgcolor=#FA8072
| 1 ||  || MCA || 17.8 || 1.5 km || multiple || 2000–2018 || 27 Sep 2018 || 65 || align=left | Disc.: LINEARAlt.: 2009 PJ3 || 
|- id="2000 QS211" bgcolor=#E9E9E9
| 0 ||  || MBA-M || 18.03 || data-sort-value="0.74" | 740 m || multiple || 2000–2021 || 26 Nov 2021 || 266 || align=left | Disc.: LINEARAlt.: 2017 XL63 || 
|- id="2000 QU211" bgcolor=#fefefe
| 1 ||  || MBA-I || 18.1 || data-sort-value="0.71" | 710 m || multiple || 2000–2019 || 31 Oct 2019 || 81 || align=left | Disc.: LINEAR || 
|- id="2000 QA220" bgcolor=#E9E9E9
| 0 ||  || MBA-M || 17.41 || data-sort-value="0.98" | 980 m || multiple || 2000–2022 || 06 Jan 2022 || 124 || align=left | Disc.: LONEOSAlt.: 2004 OJ15 || 
|- id="2000 QR221" bgcolor=#fefefe
| 0 ||  || MBA-I || 17.8 || data-sort-value="0.82" | 820 m || multiple || 2000–2021 || 16 Jan 2021 || 130 || align=left | Disc.: LONEOSAlt.: 2015 BR163 || 
|- id="2000 QA224" bgcolor=#FA8072
| 0 ||  || MCA || 18.08 || 1.0 km || multiple || 2000–2021 || 08 Jul 2021 || 77 || align=left | Disc.: Spacewatch || 
|- id="2000 QB224" bgcolor=#FA8072
| 0 ||  || MCA || 18.3 || data-sort-value="0.65" | 650 m || multiple || 2000–2019 || 04 Oct 2019 || 111 || align=left | Disc.: SpacewatchAlt.: 2016 SN23 || 
|- id="2000 QE225" bgcolor=#fefefe
| 0 ||  || MBA-I || 17.77 || data-sort-value="0.83" | 830 m || multiple || 2000–2021 || 15 Apr 2021 || 107 || align=left | Disc.: LINEARAlt.: 2011 QB69, 2015 XY21 || 
|- id="2000 QB226" bgcolor=#C2E0FF
| E ||  || TNO || 6.6 || 164 km || single || 1 day || 30 Aug 2000 || 8 || align=left | Disc.: La Silla Obs.LoUTNOs, cubewano? || 
|- id="2000 QC226" bgcolor=#C2E0FF
| 3 ||  || TNO || 6.85 || 142 km || multiple || 2000–2018 || 18 Oct 2018 || 39 || align=left | Disc.: La Silla Obs.LoUTNOs, cubewano (cold), BR-mag: 1.88 || 
|- id="2000 QD226" bgcolor=#C2E0FF
| E ||  || TNO || 7.3 || 119 km || single || 1 day || 30 Aug 2000 || 6 || align=left | Disc.: La Silla Obs.LoUTNOs, cubewano? || 
|- id="2000 QE226" bgcolor=#C2E0FF
| 3 ||  || TNO || 6.44 || 171 km || multiple || 2000–2021 || 12 Sep 2021 || 69 || align=left | Disc.: La Silla Obs.LoUTNOs, cubewano (cold) || 
|- id="2000 QF226" bgcolor=#C2E0FF
| E ||  || TNO || 8.3 || 75 km || single || 1 day || 30 Aug 2000 || 7 || align=left | Disc.: La Silla Obs.LoUTNOs, cubewano? || 
|- id="2000 QG226" bgcolor=#C2E0FF
| E ||  || TNO || 7.73 || 136 km || single || 10 days || 04 Sep 2000 || 11 || align=left | Disc.: La Silla Obs.LoUTNOs, plutino? || 
|- id="2000 QH226" bgcolor=#C2E0FF
| 2 ||  || TNO || 9.0 || 75 km || multiple || 2000–2017 || 23 Dec 2017 || 43 || align=left | Disc.: La Silla Obs.LoUTNOs, plutino || 
|- id="2000 QJ226" bgcolor=#C2E0FF
| E ||  || TNO || 8.1 || 113 km || single || 1 day || 30 Aug 2000 || 7 || align=left | Disc.: La Silla Obs.LoUTNOs, plutino? || 
|- id="2000 QK226" bgcolor=#C2E0FF
| E ||  || TNO || 8.9 || 63 km || single || 5 days || 30 Aug 2000 || 9 || align=left | Disc.: La Silla Obs.LoUTNOs, SDO || 
|- id="2000 QL226" bgcolor=#C2E0FF
| 2 ||  || TNO || 8.1 || 87 km || multiple || 2000–2018 || 18 Oct 2018 || 19 || align=left | Disc.: La Silla Obs.LoUTNOs, res4:7Alt.: 2013 SC113 || 
|- id="2000 QU231" bgcolor=#d6d6d6
| – ||  || MBA-O || 18.6 || 1.1 km || single || 26 days || 24 Sep 2000 || 13 || align=left | Disc.: LINEAR || 
|- id="2000 QM232" bgcolor=#d6d6d6
| 3 ||  || MBA-O || 18.25 || 1.2 km || multiple || 2000–2015 || 22 Apr 2015 || 27 || align=left | Disc.: Cerro Tololo || 
|- id="2000 QW232" bgcolor=#fefefe
| – ||  || MBA-I || 19.6 || data-sort-value="0.36" | 360 m || single || 9 days || 03 Sep 2000 || 6 || align=left | Disc.: Cerro Tololo || 
|- id="2000 QG233" bgcolor=#fefefe
| 0 ||  || MBA-I || 18.2 || data-sort-value="0.68" | 680 m || multiple || 2000–2021 || 18 Jan 2021 || 45 || align=left | Disc.: Cerro TololoAdded on 21 August 2021Alt.: 2015 RK150 || 
|- id="2000 QH233" bgcolor=#fefefe
| – ||  || MBA-I || 19.8 || data-sort-value="0.33" | 330 m || single || 9 days || 03 Sep 2000 || 6 || align=left | Disc.: Cerro Tololo || 
|- id="2000 QP233" bgcolor=#d6d6d6
| 0 ||  || HIL || 16.0 || 3.5 km || multiple || 2000–2021 || 03 May 2021 || 67 || align=left | Disc.: Cerro TololoAdded on 17 June 2021Alt.: 2013 EK65, 2021 EH12 || 
|- id="2000 QU233" bgcolor=#E9E9E9
| 0 ||  || MBA-M || 17.2 || 1.5 km || multiple || 1999–2020 || 02 Feb 2020 || 83 || align=left | Disc.: Cerro Tololo || 
|- id="2000 QV233" bgcolor=#C2FFFF
| E ||  || JT || 15.1 || 5.3 km || single || 3 days || 28 Aug 2000 || 6 || align=left | Disc.: Cerro TololoTrojan camp (L5) || 
|- id="2000 QW233" bgcolor=#d6d6d6
| – ||  || MBA-O || 18.6 || 1.1 km || single || 3 days || 28 Aug 2000 || 6 || align=left | Disc.: Cerro Tololo || 
|- id="2000 QE234" bgcolor=#E9E9E9
| 3 ||  || MBA-M || 19.0 || data-sort-value="0.47" | 470 m || multiple || 2000–2020 || 22 May 2020 || 23 || align=left | Disc.: Cerro TololoAdded on 22 July 2020 || 
|- id="2000 QH234" bgcolor=#E9E9E9
| 2 ||  || MBA-M || 17.9 || 1.5 km || multiple || 2000–2019 || 24 Oct 2019 || 25 || align=left | Disc.: Cerro Tololo || 
|- id="2000 QK234" bgcolor=#C2FFFF
| 0 ||  || JT || 14.1 || 8.4 km || multiple || 2000–2020 || 20 May 2020 || 100 || align=left | Disc.: Cerro TololoTrojan camp (L5) || 
|- id="2000 QJ235" bgcolor=#d6d6d6
| 0 ||  || MBA-O || 16.7 || 2.5 km || multiple || 2000–2021 || 07 Jun 2021 || 91 || align=left | Disc.: Cerro TololoAdded on 17 January 2021Alt.: 2015 FO257 || 
|- id="2000 QR235" bgcolor=#E9E9E9
| 1 ||  || MBA-M || 17.9 || 1.1 km || multiple || 2000–2020 || 25 Jan 2020 || 34 || align=left | Disc.: Cerro Tololo || 
|- id="2000 QS235" bgcolor=#E9E9E9
| 0 ||  || MBA-M || 18.66 || data-sort-value="0.55" | 550 m || multiple || 2000–2022 || 07 Jan 2022 || 39 || align=left | Disc.: Cerro TololoAdded on 17 January 2021 || 
|- id="2000 QF236" bgcolor=#E9E9E9
| 0 ||  || MBA-M || 17.9 || 1.5 km || multiple || 2000–2019 || 28 Nov 2019 || 27 || align=left | Disc.: Cerro TololoAdded on 22 July 2020Alt.: 2014 SY89 || 
|- id="2000 QG236" bgcolor=#E9E9E9
| 0 ||  || MBA-M || 18.3 || 1.2 km || multiple || 2000–2020 || 02 Feb 2020 || 49 || align=left | Disc.: Cerro TololoAdded on 21 August 2021Alt.: 2011 CT10 || 
|- id="2000 QU236" bgcolor=#d6d6d6
| 1 ||  || MBA-O || 17.4 || 1.8 km || multiple || 2000–2021 || 14 Jun 2021 || 21 || align=left | Disc.: Cerro TololoAdded on 21 August 2021Alt.: 2021 JD36 || 
|- id="2000 QZ236" bgcolor=#fefefe
| 0 ||  || MBA-I || 17.7 || data-sort-value="0.86" | 860 m || multiple || 2000–2019 || 24 Dec 2019 || 92 || align=left | Disc.: Cerro TololoAlt.: 2014 HK158 || 
|- id="2000 QD237" bgcolor=#E9E9E9
| 0 ||  || MBA-M || 19.05 || data-sort-value="0.46" | 460 m || multiple || 2000–2021 || 30 Sep 2021 || 42 || align=left | Disc.: Cerro Tololo || 
|- id="2000 QR237" bgcolor=#d6d6d6
| 0 ||  || MBA-O || 16.9 || 2.3 km || multiple || 2000–2021 || 12 Jun 2021 || 71 || align=left | Disc.: Cerro TololoAdded on 22 July 2020 || 
|- id="2000 QU237" bgcolor=#E9E9E9
| 1 ||  || MBA-M || 17.6 || 1.7 km || multiple || 2000–2018 || 08 Nov 2018 || 43 || align=left | Disc.: Cerro Tololo || 
|- id="2000 QW237" bgcolor=#d6d6d6
| 0 ||  || MBA-O || 17.1 || 2.1 km || multiple || 2000–2020 || 15 May 2020 || 42 || align=left | Disc.: Cerro TololoAlt.: 2011 SE46 || 
|- id="2000 QC238" bgcolor=#d6d6d6
| 0 ||  || MBA-O || 17.38 || 1.9 km || multiple || 2000–2021 || 14 Nov 2021 || 52 || align=left | Disc.: Cerro Tololo Obs.Added on 24 December 2021 || 
|- id="2000 QN238" bgcolor=#d6d6d6
| 3 ||  || MBA-O || 17.6 || 1.7 km || multiple || 2000–2020 || 29 Apr 2020 || 17 || align=left | Disc.: Cerro TololoAdded on 22 July 2020 || 
|- id="2000 QT238" bgcolor=#fefefe
| 0 ||  || MBA-I || 18.72 || data-sort-value="0.54" | 540 m || multiple || 2000–2022 || 27 Jan 2022 || 65 || align=left | Disc.: Cerro Tololo || 
|- id="2000 QU238" bgcolor=#E9E9E9
| 1 ||  || MBA-M || 18.2 || data-sort-value="0.96" | 960 m || multiple || 2000–2020 || 02 Feb 2020 || 30 || align=left | Disc.: Cerro TololoAdded on 22 July 2020 || 
|- id="2000 QX238" bgcolor=#E9E9E9
| 3 ||  || MBA-M || 18.7 || data-sort-value="0.54" | 540 m || multiple || 2000–2020 || 13 Sep 2020 || 19 || align=left | Disc.: Cerro TololoAdded on 17 June 2021 || 
|- id="2000 QZ238" bgcolor=#fefefe
| 0 ||  || MBA-I || 18.5 || data-sort-value="0.59" | 590 m || multiple || 2000–2019 || 26 Nov 2019 || 52 || align=left | Disc.: Cerro TololoAlt.: 2011 ON3 || 
|- id="2000 QN239" bgcolor=#E9E9E9
| – ||  || MBA-M || 20.1 || data-sort-value="0.40" | 400 m || single || 3 days || 28 Aug 2000 || 6 || align=left | Disc.: Cerro Tololo || 
|- id="2000 QR239" bgcolor=#fefefe
| 1 ||  || MBA-I || 19.77 || data-sort-value="0.37" | 330 m || multiple || 2000–2022 || 17 Aug 2022 || 40 || align=left | Disc.: Cerro Tololo || 
|- id="2000 QK240" bgcolor=#E9E9E9
| 2 ||  || MBA-M || 18.3 || data-sort-value="0.65" | 650 m || multiple || 2000–2019 || 14 Jan 2019 || 34 || align=left | Disc.: Cerro TololoAlt.: 2011 EJ109 || 
|- id="2000 QL240" bgcolor=#d6d6d6
| 0 ||  || MBA-O || 17.5 || 1.8 km || multiple || 2000–2020 || 07 Dec 2020 || 76 || align=left | Disc.: Cerro TololoAdded on 19 October 2020Alt.: 2008 FG80 || 
|- id="2000 QN240" bgcolor=#fefefe
| 0 ||  || HUN || 18.9 || data-sort-value="0.49" | 490 m || multiple || 2000–2017 || 18 Nov 2017 || 22 || align=left | Disc.: Cerro Tololo || 
|- id="2000 QU240" bgcolor=#d6d6d6
| – ||  || MBA-O || 18.1 || 1.3 km || single || 28 days || 27 Aug 2000 || 6 || align=left | Disc.: Cerro Tololo || 
|- id="2000 QK241" bgcolor=#E9E9E9
| 0 ||  || MBA-M || 17.0 || 1.7 km || multiple || 2000–2021 || 09 Jun 2021 || 209 || align=left | Disc.: Cerro TololoAlt.: 2014 UZ76 || 
|- id="2000 QT241" bgcolor=#fefefe
| 3 ||  || MBA-I || 19.1 || data-sort-value="0.45" | 450 m || multiple || 2000–2021 || 06 Oct 2021 || 43 || align=left | Disc.: Cerro Tololo Obs.Added on 5 November 2021Alt.: 2014 QU430 || 
|- id="2000 QZ241" bgcolor=#fefefe
| 0 ||  || MBA-I || 18.2 || data-sort-value="0.68" | 680 m || multiple || 2000–2020 || 24 Dec 2020 || 36 || align=left | Disc.: Cerro TololoAdded on 22 July 2020 || 
|- id="2000 QH242" bgcolor=#E9E9E9
| 0 ||  || MBA-M || 17.52 || 1.7 km || multiple || 2000–2021 || 08 Apr 2021 || 141 || align=left | Disc.: Cerro TololoAlt.: 2005 UL390 || 
|- id="2000 QK242" bgcolor=#d6d6d6
| 0 ||  || MBA-O || 16.08 || 3.4 km || multiple || 2000–2021 || 31 Aug 2021 || 197 || align=left | Disc.: Cerro TololoAlt.: 2010 FL62 || 
|- id="2000 QM242" bgcolor=#d6d6d6
| 0 ||  || MBA-O || 17.61 || 1.7 km || multiple || 2000–2021 || 08 Sep 2021 || 57 || align=left | Disc.: Cerro TololoAdded on 22 July 2020 || 
|- id="2000 QP242" bgcolor=#E9E9E9
| 0 ||  || MBA-M || 18.35 || data-sort-value="0.64" | 640 m || multiple || 2000–2021 || 03 Oct 2021 || 36 || align=left | Disc.: Cerro Tololo || 
|- id="2000 QS242" bgcolor=#E9E9E9
| 0 ||  || MBA-M || 17.89 || 1.1 km || multiple || 2000–2021 || 31 May 2021 || 57 || align=left | Disc.: Cerro Tololo || 
|- id="2000 QT242" bgcolor=#fefefe
| 0 ||  || MBA-I || 17.9 || data-sort-value="0.78" | 780 m || multiple || 1999–2021 || 16 Jan 2021 || 76 || align=left | Disc.: Cerro Tololo || 
|- id="2000 QY242" bgcolor=#fefefe
| 0 ||  || MBA-I || 18.6 || data-sort-value="0.57" | 570 m || multiple || 2000–2019 || 04 Sep 2019 || 155 || align=left | Disc.: Cerro TololoAlt.: 2015 PU69 || 
|- id="2000 QM244" bgcolor=#E9E9E9
| 0 ||  || MBA-M || 17.20 || 1.1 km || multiple || 2000–2021 || 09 Dec 2021 || 155 || align=left | Disc.: LINEARAlt.: 2004 PF28, 2013 YY64, 2015 FY201 || 
|- id="2000 QX244" bgcolor=#fefefe
| 0 ||  || MBA-I || 18.2 || data-sort-value="0.68" | 680 m || multiple || 2000–2020 || 11 Dec 2020 || 66 || align=left | Disc.: Cerro Tololo || 
|- id="2000 QP245" bgcolor=#E9E9E9
| 0 ||  || MBA-M || 18.23 || data-sort-value="0.67" | 670 m || multiple || 2000–2022 || 07 Jan 2022 || 44 || align=left | Disc.: Cerro Tololo || 
|- id="2000 QK247" bgcolor=#d6d6d6
| 0 ||  || MBA-O || 17.07 || 2.1 km || multiple || 2000–2021 || 11 Oct 2021 || 50 || align=left | Disc.: Cerro Tololo || 
|- id="2000 QZ247" bgcolor=#E9E9E9
| 0 ||  || MBA-M || 18.41 || data-sort-value="0.62" | 620 m || multiple || 2000–2020 || 15 Oct 2020 || 61 || align=left | Disc.: Cerro TololoAlt.: 2016 QK64 || 
|- id="2000 QF248" bgcolor=#FA8072
| 0 ||  || MCA || 19.0 || data-sort-value="0.47" | 470 m || multiple || 1997–2019 || 02 May 2019 || 34 || align=left | Disc.: Cerro TololoAdded on 9 March 2021 || 
|- id="2000 QG248" bgcolor=#E9E9E9
| 0 ||  || MBA-M || 17.54 || data-sort-value="0.92" | 920 m || multiple || 2000–2022 || 22 Jan 2022 || 62 || align=left | Disc.: Cerro Tololo Obs.Added on 29 January 2022 || 
|- id="2000 QV248" bgcolor=#E9E9E9
| 0 ||  || MBA-M || 18.41 || data-sort-value="0.87" | 870 m || multiple || 2000–2021 || 02 Oct 2021 || 90 || align=left | Disc.: Cerro Tololo || 
|- id="2000 QD249" bgcolor=#fefefe
| 3 ||  || MBA-I || 20.2 || data-sort-value="0.27" | 270 m || multiple || 2000–2019 || 26 Sep 2019 || 20 || align=left | Disc.: Cerro TololoAdded on 22 July 2020 || 
|- id="2000 QL251" bgcolor=#C2E0FF
| 2 ||  || TNO || 6.8 || 148 km || multiple || 2000–2019 || 26 Oct 2019 || 56 || align=left | Disc.: Cerro TololoLoUTNOs, twotino, albedo: 0.070; BR-mag: 1.36; taxonomy: BR; binary: 143 km || 
|- id="2000 QN251" bgcolor=#C2E0FF
| 3 ||  || TNO || 7.36 || 122 km || multiple || 2000–2021 || 13 Sep 2021 || 26 || align=left | Disc.: Cerro TololoLoUTNOs, res3:5, BR-mag: 1.63; taxonomy: IR-RR || 
|- id="2000 QJ252" bgcolor=#C2E0FF
| E ||  || TNO || 7.6 || 104 km || single || 24 days || 25 Aug 2000 || 4 || align=left | Disc.: Cerro TololoLoUTNOs, cubewano? || 
|- id="2000 QK252" bgcolor=#C2E0FF
| E ||  || TNO || 6.3 || 189 km || single || 27 days || 27 Aug 2000 || 4 || align=left | Disc.: Cerro TololoLoUTNOs, cubewano? || 
|- id="2000 QL252" bgcolor=#C2E0FF
| 3 ||  || TNO || 7.6 || 114 km || multiple || 2000–2020 || 20 Oct 2020 || 9 || align=left | Disc.: Cerro TololoLoUTNOs, SDOAlt.: 2006 UN321 || 
|- id="2000 QN252" bgcolor=#C2E0FF
| E ||  || TNO || 7.7 || 120 km || single || 28 days || 28 Aug 2000 || 4 || align=left | Disc.: Cerro TololoLoUTNOs, other TNO || 
|- id="2000 QO252" bgcolor=#C2E0FF
| E ||  || TNO || 7.0 || 137 km || single || 29 days || 28 Aug 2000 || 4 || align=left | Disc.: Cerro TololoLoUTNOs, cubewano? || 
|- id="2000 QB253" bgcolor=#d6d6d6
| 0 ||  || MBA-O || 15.8 || 3.9 km || multiple || 1994–2020 || 23 Dec 2020 || 101 || align=left | Disc.: AstrovirtelAlt.: 2001 VM130, 2010 AD145 || 
|- id="2000 QG253" bgcolor=#d6d6d6
| 1 ||  || MBA-O || 17.4 || 1.8 km || multiple || 2000–2016 || 03 Aug 2016 || 23 || align=left | Disc.: AstrovirtelAdded on 21 August 2021 || 
|- id="2000 QA255" bgcolor=#fefefe
| 0 ||  || MBA-I || 18.13 || data-sort-value="0.70" | 700 m || multiple || 1994–2021 || 11 May 2021 || 140 || align=left | Disc.: LINEARAlt.: 2016 XC || 
|- id="2000 QG255" bgcolor=#E9E9E9
| 0 ||  || MBA-M || 17.65 || data-sort-value="0.88" | 880 m || multiple || 2000–2021 || 09 Nov 2021 || 173 || align=left | Disc.: Spacewatch || 
|- id="2000 QM255" bgcolor=#fefefe
| 0 ||  || MBA-I || 18.11 || data-sort-value="0.71" | 710 m || multiple || 2000–2021 || 31 Mar 2021 || 116 || align=left | Disc.: Cerro Tololo || 
|- id="2000 QP255" bgcolor=#fefefe
| 0 ||  || MBA-I || 18.7 || data-sort-value="0.54" | 540 m || multiple || 2000–2020 || 10 Dec 2020 || 204 || align=left | Disc.: Cerro Tololo || 
|- id="2000 QR255" bgcolor=#E9E9E9
| 0 ||  || MBA-M || 17.56 || 1.7 km || multiple || 2000–2021 || 15 Apr 2021 || 71 || align=left | Disc.: Cerro Tololo || 
|- id="2000 QS255" bgcolor=#d6d6d6
| 0 ||  || MBA-O || 16.5 || 2.8 km || multiple || 2000–2020 || 14 May 2020 || 59 || align=left | Disc.: Cerro Tololo || 
|- id="2000 QU255" bgcolor=#E9E9E9
| 0 ||  || MBA-M || 17.3 || 1.9 km || multiple || 2000–2021 || 18 Jan 2021 || 114 || align=left | Disc.: Cerro Tololo || 
|- id="2000 QV255" bgcolor=#fefefe
| 0 ||  || MBA-I || 18.4 || data-sort-value="0.62" | 620 m || multiple || 2000–2021 || 16 Jan 2021 || 60 || align=left | Disc.: Spacewatch || 
|- id="2000 QW255" bgcolor=#d6d6d6
| 0 ||  || MBA-O || 17.2 || 2.0 km || multiple || 2000–2019 || 29 Mar 2019 || 54 || align=left | Disc.: Cerro Tololo || 
|- id="2000 QX255" bgcolor=#fefefe
| 0 ||  || MBA-I || 18.8 || data-sort-value="0.52" | 520 m || multiple || 2000–2020 || 15 Oct 2020 || 62 || align=left | Disc.: Cerro Tololo || 
|- id="2000 QY255" bgcolor=#E9E9E9
| 0 ||  || MBA-M || 17.22 || 1.1 km || multiple || 2000–2022 || 04 Jan 2022 || 92 || align=left | Disc.: Cerro Tololo || 
|- id="2000 QB256" bgcolor=#d6d6d6
| 0 ||  || MBA-O || 16.86 || 2.4 km || multiple || 2000–2021 || 08 Sep 2021 || 59 || align=left | Disc.: Cerro Tololo || 
|- id="2000 QC256" bgcolor=#fefefe
| 0 ||  || MBA-I || 18.44 || data-sort-value="0.61" | 610 m || multiple || 2000–2021 || 08 May 2021 || 74 || align=left | Disc.: Cerro Tololo || 
|- id="2000 QD256" bgcolor=#fefefe
| 0 ||  || MBA-I || 18.6 || data-sort-value="0.57" | 570 m || multiple || 2000–2020 || 14 Sep 2020 || 71 || align=left | Disc.: Cerro Tololo || 
|- id="2000 QF256" bgcolor=#fefefe
| 0 ||  || MBA-I || 18.81 || data-sort-value="0.51" | 510 m || multiple || 2000–2021 || 09 Aug 2021 || 82 || align=left | Disc.: Cerro Tololo || 
|- id="2000 QG256" bgcolor=#fefefe
| 0 ||  || MBA-I || 18.7 || data-sort-value="0.54" | 540 m || multiple || 2000–2020 || 22 Aug 2020 || 73 || align=left | Disc.: Spacewatch || 
|- id="2000 QH256" bgcolor=#fefefe
| 0 ||  || MBA-I || 17.89 || data-sort-value="0.79" | 790 m || multiple || 1995–2021 || 18 May 2021 || 98 || align=left | Disc.: Cerro Tololo || 
|- id="2000 QJ256" bgcolor=#fefefe
| 0 ||  || MBA-I || 18.7 || data-sort-value="0.54" | 540 m || multiple || 2000–2021 || 15 Jan 2021 || 59 || align=left | Disc.: Cerro Tololo || 
|- id="2000 QK256" bgcolor=#E9E9E9
| 0 ||  || MBA-M || 17.22 || 1.5 km || multiple || 2000–2021 || 18 Jun 2021 || 135 || align=left | Disc.: Cerro Tololo || 
|- id="2000 QL256" bgcolor=#fefefe
| 0 ||  || MBA-I || 19.0 || data-sort-value="0.47" | 470 m || multiple || 2000–2018 || 13 Dec 2018 || 41 || align=left | Disc.: Cerro Tololo || 
|- id="2000 QM256" bgcolor=#fefefe
| 1 ||  || MBA-I || 18.7 || data-sort-value="0.54" | 540 m || multiple || 2000–2021 || 17 Jan 2021 || 51 || align=left | Disc.: Spacewatch || 
|- id="2000 QO256" bgcolor=#E9E9E9
| 0 ||  || MBA-M || 17.2 || 2.0 km || multiple || 2000–2021 || 15 Jan 2021 || 81 || align=left | Disc.: Cerro Tololo || 
|- id="2000 QP256" bgcolor=#E9E9E9
| 0 ||  || MBA-M || 17.63 || data-sort-value="0.89" | 890 m || multiple || 2000–2021 || 31 Oct 2021 || 60 || align=left | Disc.: Cerro Tololo || 
|- id="2000 QQ256" bgcolor=#E9E9E9
| 0 ||  || MBA-M || 17.6 || 1.3 km || multiple || 2000–2020 || 26 Jan 2020 || 44 || align=left | Disc.: Spacewatch || 
|- id="2000 QR256" bgcolor=#fefefe
| 1 ||  || MBA-I || 18.1 || data-sort-value="0.71" | 710 m || multiple || 2000–2019 || 29 Oct 2019 || 55 || align=left | Disc.: Cerro Tololo || 
|- id="2000 QS256" bgcolor=#fefefe
| 0 ||  || MBA-I || 17.8 || data-sort-value="0.82" | 820 m || multiple || 2000–2020 || 10 Dec 2020 || 78 || align=left | Disc.: Cerro Tololo || 
|- id="2000 QT256" bgcolor=#E9E9E9
| 0 ||  || MBA-M || 17.80 || 1.2 km || multiple || 2000–2021 || 03 Aug 2021 || 53 || align=left | Disc.: Cerro Tololo || 
|- id="2000 QU256" bgcolor=#d6d6d6
| 0 ||  || MBA-O || 16.78 || 2.5 km || multiple || 2000–2021 || 07 Jul 2021 || 93 || align=left | Disc.: Cerro Tololo || 
|- id="2000 QV256" bgcolor=#fefefe
| 0 ||  || MBA-I || 18.7 || data-sort-value="0.54" | 540 m || multiple || 2000–2020 || 01 Feb 2020 || 47 || align=left | Disc.: Cerro TololoAlt.: 2013 EB44 || 
|- id="2000 QW256" bgcolor=#fefefe
| 0 ||  || MBA-I || 18.3 || data-sort-value="0.65" | 650 m || multiple || 2000–2020 || 15 Dec 2020 || 57 || align=left | Disc.: Cerro Tololo || 
|- id="2000 QX256" bgcolor=#E9E9E9
| 0 ||  || MBA-M || 18.31 || data-sort-value="0.65" | 650 m || multiple || 2000–2021 || 02 Oct 2021 || 58 || align=left | Disc.: Cerro Tololo || 
|- id="2000 QY256" bgcolor=#fefefe
| 0 ||  || MBA-I || 18.7 || data-sort-value="0.54" | 540 m || multiple || 2000–2020 || 16 Sep 2020 || 92 || align=left | Disc.: Spacewatch || 
|- id="2000 QZ256" bgcolor=#fefefe
| 0 ||  || MBA-I || 18.66 || data-sort-value="0.55" | 550 m || multiple || 2000–2021 || 03 Oct 2021 || 61 || align=left | Disc.: Cerro Tololo || 
|- id="2000 QA257" bgcolor=#fefefe
| 0 ||  || MBA-I || 17.8 || data-sort-value="0.82" | 820 m || multiple || 2000–2020 || 16 Dec 2020 || 47 || align=left | Disc.: Cerro Tololo || 
|- id="2000 QB257" bgcolor=#d6d6d6
| 0 ||  || MBA-O || 17.00 || 2.2 km || multiple || 2000–2021 || 26 Sep 2021 || 48 || align=left | Disc.: Cerro Tololo || 
|- id="2000 QC257" bgcolor=#E9E9E9
| 0 ||  || MBA-M || 18.56 || data-sort-value="0.58" | 580 m || multiple || 2000–2021 || 28 Sep 2021 || 55 || align=left | Disc.: Cerro Tololo || 
|- id="2000 QD257" bgcolor=#fefefe
| 1 ||  || MBA-I || 18.9 || data-sort-value="0.49" | 490 m || multiple || 2000–2020 || 13 May 2020 || 58 || align=left | Disc.: Cerro Tololo || 
|- id="2000 QE257" bgcolor=#fefefe
| 0 ||  || MBA-I || 18.39 || data-sort-value="0.62" | 620 m || multiple || 2000–2021 || 04 Aug 2021 || 39 || align=left | Disc.: Cerro Tololo || 
|- id="2000 QF257" bgcolor=#fefefe
| 2 ||  || MBA-I || 19.8 || data-sort-value="0.33" | 330 m || multiple || 2000–2017 || 22 Oct 2017 || 38 || align=left | Disc.: Cerro Tololo || 
|- id="2000 QG257" bgcolor=#fefefe
| 0 ||  || MBA-I || 18.6 || data-sort-value="0.57" | 570 m || multiple || 2000–2020 || 23 Apr 2020 || 40 || align=left | Disc.: Cerro Tololo || 
|- id="2000 QH257" bgcolor=#d6d6d6
| 0 ||  || MBA-O || 17.4 || 1.8 km || multiple || 2000–2020 || 14 Dec 2020 || 51 || align=left | Disc.: Cerro Tololo || 
|- id="2000 QK257" bgcolor=#d6d6d6
| 0 ||  || MBA-O || 16.87 || 2.4 km || multiple || 2000–2021 || 11 Sep 2021 || 53 || align=left | Disc.: Cerro Tololo || 
|- id="2000 QL257" bgcolor=#d6d6d6
| 0 ||  || MBA-O || 16.1 || 3.4 km || multiple || 2000–2020 || 11 May 2020 || 80 || align=left | Disc.: Cerro Tololo || 
|- id="2000 QM257" bgcolor=#d6d6d6
| 0 ||  || MBA-O || 16.8 || 2.4 km || multiple || 2000–2021 || 15 Jan 2021 || 33 || align=left | Disc.: Cerro Tololo || 
|- id="2000 QN257" bgcolor=#fefefe
| 0 ||  || MBA-I || 18.81 || data-sort-value="0.51" | 510 m || multiple || 2000–2021 || 12 May 2021 || 55 || align=left | Disc.: Cerro Tololo || 
|- id="2000 QO257" bgcolor=#fefefe
| 0 ||  || MBA-I || 18.9 || data-sort-value="0.49" | 490 m || multiple || 2000–2020 || 02 Feb 2020 || 45 || align=left | Disc.: Cerro Tololo || 
|- id="2000 QP257" bgcolor=#d6d6d6
| 0 ||  || MBA-O || 17.0 || 2.2 km || multiple || 2000–2018 || 10 Jan 2018 || 31 || align=left | Disc.: Spacewatch || 
|- id="2000 QQ257" bgcolor=#E9E9E9
| 0 ||  || MBA-M || 17.8 || 1.2 km || multiple || 2000–2020 || 13 Jul 2020 || 42 || align=left | Disc.: Cerro Tololo || 
|- id="2000 QR257" bgcolor=#fefefe
| 0 ||  || MBA-I || 18.88 || data-sort-value="0.50" | 500 m || multiple || 2000–2021 || 10 Oct 2021 || 108 || align=left | Disc.: Cerro Tololo || 
|- id="2000 QS257" bgcolor=#fefefe
| 0 ||  || MBA-I || 18.39 || data-sort-value="0.62" | 620 m || multiple || 2000–2021 || 10 Feb 2021 || 51 || align=left | Disc.: Cerro Tololo || 
|- id="2000 QT257" bgcolor=#fefefe
| 0 ||  || MBA-I || 18.6 || data-sort-value="0.57" | 570 m || multiple || 2000–2020 || 23 May 2020 || 80 || align=left | Disc.: Cerro Tololo || 
|- id="2000 QU257" bgcolor=#E9E9E9
| 0 ||  || MBA-M || 18.3 || data-sort-value="0.92" | 920 m || multiple || 2000–2017 || 16 Aug 2017 || 26 || align=left | Disc.: Cerro Tololo || 
|- id="2000 QV257" bgcolor=#E9E9E9
| 0 ||  || MBA-M || 17.86 || 1.1 km || multiple || 2000–2021 || 24 Oct 2021 || 67 || align=left | Disc.: Cerro Tololo || 
|- id="2000 QW257" bgcolor=#E9E9E9
| 0 ||  || MBA-M || 17.6 || 1.7 km || multiple || 2000–2018 || 05 Aug 2018 || 27 || align=left | Disc.: Cerro Tololo || 
|- id="2000 QX257" bgcolor=#fefefe
| 0 ||  || MBA-I || 18.5 || data-sort-value="0.59" | 590 m || multiple || 2000–2020 || 22 Jul 2020 || 39 || align=left | Disc.: Spacewatch || 
|- id="2000 QZ257" bgcolor=#fefefe
| 0 ||  || HUN || 19.1 || data-sort-value="0.45" | 450 m || multiple || 2000–2019 || 22 Oct 2019 || 27 || align=left | Disc.: Cerro Tololo || 
|- id="2000 QA258" bgcolor=#E9E9E9
| 1 ||  || MBA-M || 17.8 || 1.2 km || multiple || 2000–2017 || 14 Aug 2017 || 25 || align=left | Disc.: Cerro Tololo || 
|- id="2000 QB258" bgcolor=#E9E9E9
| 0 ||  || MBA-M || 18.05 || 1.4 km || multiple || 2000–2021 || 15 Apr 2021 || 33 || align=left | Disc.: Cerro Tololo || 
|- id="2000 QC258" bgcolor=#d6d6d6
| 2 ||  || MBA-O || 17.5 || 1.8 km || multiple || 2000–2017 || 14 Dec 2017 || 17 || align=left | Disc.: Cerro Tololo || 
|- id="2000 QD258" bgcolor=#E9E9E9
| 0 ||  || MBA-M || 17.2 || 2.0 km || multiple || 2000–2021 || 18 Jan 2021 || 82 || align=left | Disc.: Cerro Tololo || 
|- id="2000 QE258" bgcolor=#E9E9E9
| 0 ||  || MBA-M || 17.81 || data-sort-value="0.81" | 810 m || multiple || 2000–2022 || 05 Jan 2022 || 83 || align=left | Disc.: Cerro Tololo || 
|- id="2000 QF258" bgcolor=#C2FFFF
| 0 ||  || JT || 14.5 || 7.0 km || multiple || 2000–2020 || 24 Jun 2020 || 69 || align=left | Disc.: Cerro TololoTrojan camp (L5) || 
|- id="2000 QG258" bgcolor=#fefefe
| 0 ||  || MBA-I || 18.7 || data-sort-value="0.54" | 540 m || multiple || 2000–2019 || 28 Nov 2019 || 59 || align=left | Disc.: Spacewatch || 
|- id="2000 QH258" bgcolor=#fefefe
| 0 ||  || MBA-I || 18.72 || data-sort-value="0.54" | 540 m || multiple || 2000–2022 || 27 Jan 2022 || 75 || align=left | Disc.: Spacewatch || 
|- id="2000 QJ258" bgcolor=#fefefe
| 1 ||  || MBA-I || 18.2 || data-sort-value="0.68" | 680 m || multiple || 2000–2019 || 01 Nov 2019 || 57 || align=left | Disc.: Spacewatch || 
|- id="2000 QL258" bgcolor=#fefefe
| 0 ||  || MBA-I || 18.2 || data-sort-value="0.68" | 680 m || multiple || 2000–2020 || 21 Jan 2020 || 62 || align=left | Disc.: Cerro Tololo || 
|- id="2000 QM258" bgcolor=#fefefe
| 1 ||  || MBA-I || 18.7 || data-sort-value="0.54" | 540 m || multiple || 2000–2018 || 14 Dec 2018 || 60 || align=left | Disc.: Spacewatch || 
|- id="2000 QN258" bgcolor=#fefefe
| 0 ||  || MBA-I || 18.29 || data-sort-value="0.65" | 650 m || multiple || 2000–2021 || 15 Apr 2021 || 66 || align=left | Disc.: Cerro Tololo || 
|- id="2000 QP258" bgcolor=#E9E9E9
| 0 ||  || MBA-M || 17.3 || 1.9 km || multiple || 2000–2021 || 18 Jan 2021 || 67 || align=left | Disc.: Cerro Tololo || 
|- id="2000 QQ258" bgcolor=#fefefe
| 0 ||  || MBA-I || 18.1 || data-sort-value="0.71" | 710 m || multiple || 2000–2019 || 28 Aug 2019 || 49 || align=left | Disc.: Cerro Tololo || 
|- id="2000 QR258" bgcolor=#fefefe
| 0 ||  || MBA-I || 18.5 || data-sort-value="0.59" | 590 m || multiple || 2000–2019 || 02 Nov 2019 || 42 || align=left | Disc.: Cerro Tololo || 
|- id="2000 QS258" bgcolor=#E9E9E9
| 0 ||  || MBA-M || 18.3 || data-sort-value="0.92" | 920 m || multiple || 2000–2019 || 05 Feb 2019 || 57 || align=left | Disc.: Cerro Tololo || 
|- id="2000 QT258" bgcolor=#C2FFFF
| 0 ||  || JT || 14.2 || 8.0 km || multiple || 1995–2020 || 23 Jun 2020 || 77 || align=left | Disc.: Cerro TololoTrojan camp (L5) || 
|- id="2000 QU258" bgcolor=#E9E9E9
| 0 ||  || MBA-M || 17.9 || 1.1 km || multiple || 2000–2020 || 25 Mar 2020 || 48 || align=left | Disc.: Cerro Tololo || 
|- id="2000 QV258" bgcolor=#d6d6d6
| 1 ||  || MBA-O || 16.9 || 2.3 km || multiple || 2000–2019 || 05 Apr 2019 || 46 || align=left | Disc.: Cerro Tololo || 
|- id="2000 QX258" bgcolor=#E9E9E9
| 0 ||  || MBA-M || 17.4 || 1.8 km || multiple || 2000–2021 || 15 Jan 2021 || 52 || align=left | Disc.: Cerro Tololo || 
|- id="2000 QY258" bgcolor=#fefefe
| 0 ||  || MBA-I || 18.5 || data-sort-value="0.59" | 590 m || multiple || 2000–2019 || 03 Dec 2019 || 44 || align=left | Disc.: Cerro Tololo || 
|- id="2000 QA259" bgcolor=#E9E9E9
| 0 ||  || MBA-M || 17.68 || 1.6 km || multiple || 2000–2021 || 03 May 2021 || 59 || align=left | Disc.: Cerro Tololo || 
|- id="2000 QC259" bgcolor=#fefefe
| 1 ||  || MBA-I || 18.4 || data-sort-value="0.62" | 620 m || multiple || 2000–2018 || 02 Nov 2018 || 40 || align=left | Disc.: Cerro Tololo || 
|- id="2000 QD259" bgcolor=#E9E9E9
| 0 ||  || MBA-M || 18.03 || data-sort-value="0.74" | 740 m || multiple || 2000–2021 || 26 Nov 2021 || 86 || align=left | Disc.: Spacewatch || 
|- id="2000 QE259" bgcolor=#d6d6d6
| 0 ||  || MBA-O || 17.61 || 1.7 km || multiple || 2000–2021 || 14 May 2021 || 200 || align=left | Disc.: Cerro Tololo || 
|- id="2000 QF259" bgcolor=#E9E9E9
| 0 ||  || MBA-M || 18.0 || 1.4 km || multiple || 2000–2018 || 08 Nov 2018 || 38 || align=left | Disc.: Cerro Tololo || 
|- id="2000 QG259" bgcolor=#d6d6d6
| 0 ||  || MBA-O || 17.37 || 1.9 km || multiple || 2000–2021 || 08 Aug 2021 || 52 || align=left | Disc.: Cerro Tololo || 
|- id="2000 QH259" bgcolor=#E9E9E9
| 0 ||  || MBA-M || 17.4 || 1.8 km || multiple || 2000–2019 || 28 Nov 2019 || 39 || align=left | Disc.: Cerro Tololo || 
|- id="2000 QJ259" bgcolor=#d6d6d6
| 0 ||  || MBA-O || 17.16 || 2.1 km || multiple || 2000–2021 || 10 Sep 2021 || 59 || align=left | Disc.: Cerro Tololo || 
|- id="2000 QK259" bgcolor=#E9E9E9
| 1 ||  || MBA-M || 17.4 || 1.8 km || multiple || 2000–2020 || 26 Jan 2020 || 47 || align=left | Disc.: Cerro Tololo || 
|- id="2000 QL259" bgcolor=#fefefe
| 1 ||  || MBA-I || 18.9 || data-sort-value="0.49" | 490 m || multiple || 2000–2019 || 27 Nov 2019 || 38 || align=left | Disc.: Cerro Tololo || 
|- id="2000 QM259" bgcolor=#fefefe
| 0 ||  || MBA-I || 18.4 || data-sort-value="0.62" | 620 m || multiple || 2000–2018 || 11 Jul 2018 || 32 || align=left | Disc.: Cerro Tololo || 
|- id="2000 QN259" bgcolor=#E9E9E9
| 0 ||  || MBA-M || 17.4 || 1.8 km || multiple || 2000–2018 || 17 Aug 2018 || 30 || align=left | Disc.: Cerro Tololo || 
|- id="2000 QO259" bgcolor=#d6d6d6
| 0 ||  || MBA-O || 17.16 || 2.1 km || multiple || 2000–2021 || 09 May 2021 || 50 || align=left | Disc.: Cerro Tololo || 
|- id="2000 QP259" bgcolor=#fefefe
| 1 ||  || MBA-I || 18.88 || data-sort-value="0.50" | 500 m || multiple || 2000–2021 || 08 Sep 2021 || 45 || align=left | Disc.: Cerro Tololo || 
|- id="2000 QQ259" bgcolor=#fefefe
| 0 ||  || MBA-I || 19.24 || data-sort-value="0.42" | 420 m || multiple || 2000–2021 || 08 Jul 2021 || 36 || align=left | Disc.: Cerro Tololo || 
|- id="2000 QR259" bgcolor=#E9E9E9
| 0 ||  || MBA-M || 18.3 || 1.2 km || multiple || 2000–2019 || 06 Sep 2019 || 138 || align=left | Disc.: Cerro Tololo || 
|- id="2000 QS259" bgcolor=#fefefe
| 0 ||  || MBA-I || 17.6 || data-sort-value="0.90" | 900 m || multiple || 2000–2020 || 09 Dec 2020 || 87 || align=left | Disc.: Spacewatch || 
|- id="2000 QT259" bgcolor=#d6d6d6
| 0 ||  || MBA-O || 17.6 || 1.7 km || multiple || 2000–2019 || 23 Sep 2019 || 59 || align=left | Disc.: Cerro Tololo || 
|- id="2000 QU259" bgcolor=#d6d6d6
| 0 ||  || MBA-O || 17.1 || 2.1 km || multiple || 2000–2020 || 20 Oct 2020 || 109 || align=left | Disc.: Cerro Tololo || 
|- id="2000 QV259" bgcolor=#d6d6d6
| 0 ||  || MBA-O || 17.1 || 2.1 km || multiple || 2000–2020 || 10 Oct 2020 || 86 || align=left | Disc.: Spacewatch || 
|- id="2000 QW259" bgcolor=#E9E9E9
| 0 ||  || MBA-M || 17.5 || 1.8 km || multiple || 2000–2019 || 29 Sep 2019 || 49 || align=left | Disc.: Cerro Tololo || 
|- id="2000 QY259" bgcolor=#C2FFFF
| 0 ||  || JT || 14.8 || 6.1 km || multiple || 2000–2020 || 17 Jun 2020 || 63 || align=left | Disc.: Cerro TololoTrojan camp (L5) || 
|- id="2000 QZ259" bgcolor=#d6d6d6
| 0 ||  || MBA-O || 17.2 || 2.0 km || multiple || 2000–2019 || 07 Apr 2019 || 39 || align=left | Disc.: Cerro Tololo || 
|- id="2000 QA260" bgcolor=#fefefe
| 0 ||  || MBA-I || 19.0 || data-sort-value="0.47" | 470 m || multiple || 2000–2019 || 07 May 2019 || 42 || align=left | Disc.: Cerro Tololo || 
|- id="2000 QD260" bgcolor=#fefefe
| 0 ||  || MBA-I || 18.8 || data-sort-value="0.52" | 520 m || multiple || 2000–2019 || 03 Dec 2019 || 35 || align=left | Disc.: Spacewatch || 
|- id="2000 QE260" bgcolor=#d6d6d6
| 0 ||  || MBA-O || 17.72 || 1.6 km || multiple || 2000–2022 || 25 Jan 2022 || 43 || align=left | Disc.: Cerro Tololo || 
|- id="2000 QF260" bgcolor=#d6d6d6
| 0 ||  || MBA-O || 17.7 || 1.6 km || multiple || 2000–2019 || 04 Feb 2019 || 28 || align=left | Disc.: Cerro Tololo || 
|- id="2000 QG260" bgcolor=#d6d6d6
| 0 ||  || MBA-O || 17.6 || 1.7 km || multiple || 2000–2019 || 01 Jul 2019 || 24 || align=left | Disc.: Cerro Tololo || 
|- id="2000 QH260" bgcolor=#fefefe
| 2 ||  || MBA-I || 18.2 || data-sort-value="0.68" | 680 m || multiple || 2000–2019 || 29 Jul 2019 || 28 || align=left | Disc.: Cerro Tololo || 
|- id="2000 QJ260" bgcolor=#d6d6d6
| 0 ||  || MBA-O || 18.0 || 1.4 km || multiple || 2000–2019 || 28 Aug 2019 || 20 || align=left | Disc.: Cerro Tololo || 
|- id="2000 QK260" bgcolor=#fefefe
| 0 ||  || MBA-I || 19.3 || data-sort-value="0.41" | 410 m || multiple || 2000–2020 || 19 Aug 2020 || 30 || align=left | Disc.: Cerro Tololo || 
|- id="2000 QL260" bgcolor=#E9E9E9
| 0 ||  || MBA-M || 17.6 || 1.7 km || multiple || 2000–2019 || 28 Nov 2019 || 52 || align=left | Disc.: Cerro Tololo || 
|- id="2000 QN260" bgcolor=#fefefe
| 0 ||  || MBA-I || 18.7 || data-sort-value="0.54" | 540 m || multiple || 2000–2019 || 17 Dec 2019 || 50 || align=left | Disc.: Cerro Tololo || 
|- id="2000 QO260" bgcolor=#fefefe
| 1 ||  || MBA-I || 18.8 || data-sort-value="0.52" | 520 m || multiple || 2000–2020 || 26 Jan 2020 || 39 || align=left | Disc.: Cerro Tololo || 
|- id="2000 QP260" bgcolor=#E9E9E9
| 0 ||  || MBA-M || 18.16 || 1.3 km || multiple || 2000–2019 || 27 Oct 2019 || 52 || align=left | Disc.: Cerro Tololo || 
|- id="2000 QQ260" bgcolor=#E9E9E9
| 1 ||  || MBA-M || 17.9 || 1.5 km || multiple || 2000–2019 || 02 Dec 2019 || 39 || align=left | Disc.: Cerro Tololo || 
|- id="2000 QR260" bgcolor=#d6d6d6
| 0 ||  || MBA-O || 17.4 || 1.8 km || multiple || 2000–2020 || 22 Apr 2020 || 34 || align=left | Disc.: Cerro Tololo || 
|- id="2000 QS260" bgcolor=#d6d6d6
| 0 ||  || MBA-O || 17.27 || 2.0 km || multiple || 2000–2021 || 09 Aug 2021 || 31 || align=left | Disc.: Cerro Tololo || 
|- id="2000 QT260" bgcolor=#E9E9E9
| 0 ||  = (619210) || MBA-M || 17.7 || 1.2 km || multiple || 2000–2020 || 24 Mar 2020 || 61 || align=left | Disc.: Cerro Tololo || 
|- id="2000 QU260" bgcolor=#d6d6d6
| 0 ||  || MBA-O || 16.7 || 2.5 km || multiple || 2000–2020 || 27 Apr 2020 || 52 || align=left | Disc.: Cerro Tololo || 
|- id="2000 QV260" bgcolor=#d6d6d6
| 0 ||  || MBA-O || 16.7 || 2.5 km || multiple || 2000–2020 || 16 Mar 2020 || 47 || align=left | Disc.: Cerro Tololo || 
|- id="2000 QW260" bgcolor=#fefefe
| 0 ||  = (619211) || MBA-I || 18.3 || data-sort-value="0.65" | 650 m || multiple || 2000–2020 || 22 Mar 2020 || 55 || align=left | Disc.: Cerro Tololo || 
|- id="2000 QX260" bgcolor=#E9E9E9
| 0 ||  || MBA-M || 17.83 || data-sort-value="0.81" | 810 m || multiple || 2000–2022 || 26 Jan 2022 || 88 || align=left | Disc.: Cerro Tololo || 
|- id="2000 QY260" bgcolor=#fefefe
| 0 ||  || MBA-I || 18.8 || data-sort-value="0.52" | 520 m || multiple || 2000–2020 || 24 Jan 2020 || 41 || align=left | Disc.: Cerro Tololo || 
|- id="2000 QZ260" bgcolor=#E9E9E9
| 0 ||  || MBA-M || 18.0 || 1.4 km || multiple || 2000–2019 || 26 Nov 2019 || 35 || align=left | Disc.: Cerro Tololo || 
|- id="2000 QA261" bgcolor=#d6d6d6
| 0 ||  || MBA-O || 16.55 || 2.7 km || multiple || 2000–2021 || 09 Apr 2021 || 84 || align=left | Disc.: Cerro TololoAlt.: 2010 BP134, 2010 MJ88, 2010 MG146 || 
|- id="2000 QB261" bgcolor=#E9E9E9
| 0 ||  || MBA-M || 18.27 || data-sort-value="0.66" | 660 m || multiple || 2000–2021 || 01 Nov 2021 || 54 || align=left | Disc.: Cerro Tololo || 
|- id="2000 QC261" bgcolor=#fefefe
| 0 ||  || MBA-I || 18.7 || data-sort-value="0.54" | 540 m || multiple || 2000–2020 || 21 Dec 2020 || 44 || align=left | Disc.: Cerro Tololo || 
|- id="2000 QE261" bgcolor=#fefefe
| 0 ||  || MBA-I || 18.4 || data-sort-value="0.62" | 620 m || multiple || 2000–2019 || 29 Sep 2019 || 26 || align=left | Disc.: Cerro Tololo || 
|- id="2000 QF261" bgcolor=#d6d6d6
| 0 ||  || HIL || 16.02 || 3.5 km || multiple || 2000–2021 || 11 May 2021 || 43 || align=left | Disc.: Cerro Tololo || 
|- id="2000 QG261" bgcolor=#d6d6d6
| 0 ||  || MBA-O || 17.2 || 2.0 km || multiple || 2000–2020 || 21 Apr 2020 || 28 || align=left | Disc.: Cerro Tololo || 
|- id="2000 QH261" bgcolor=#d6d6d6
| 0 ||  || MBA-O || 17.1 || 2.1 km || multiple || 2000–2020 || 19 Jan 2020 || 25 || align=left | Disc.: Astrovirtel || 
|- id="2000 QJ261" bgcolor=#E9E9E9
| 0 ||  || MBA-M || 17.6 || 1.7 km || multiple || 2000–2019 || 20 Dec 2019 || 53 || align=left | Disc.: Cerro TololoAdded on 22 July 2020 || 
|- id="2000 QK261" bgcolor=#d6d6d6
| 0 ||  || MBA-O || 17.1 || 2.1 km || multiple || 2000–2018 || 06 Oct 2018 || 44 || align=left | Disc.: SpacewatchAdded on 19 October 2020 || 
|- id="2000 QL261" bgcolor=#E9E9E9
| 1 ||  || MBA-M || 19.05 || data-sort-value="0.46" | 460 m || multiple || 2000–2021 || 28 Nov 2021 || 23 || align=left | Disc.: Cerro TololoAdded on 19 October 2020 || 
|- id="2000 QM261" bgcolor=#E9E9E9
| 0 ||  || MBA-M || 18.54 || data-sort-value="0.82" | 820 m || multiple || 1999–2021 || 15 Apr 2021 || 31 || align=left | Disc.: Cerro TololoAdded on 11 May 2021 || 
|- id="2000 QN261" bgcolor=#d6d6d6
| 0 ||  || MBA-O || 16.9 || 2.3 km || multiple || 2000–2016 || 08 Aug 2016 || 26 || align=left | Disc.: Cerro Tololo Obs.Added on 5 November 2021 || 
|- id="2000 QO261" bgcolor=#E9E9E9
| 3 ||  || MBA-M || 17.7 || 1.6 km || multiple || 2000–2014 || 26 Nov 2014 || 17 || align=left | Disc.: Cerro Tololo Obs.Added on 24 December 2021 || 
|}
back to top

R 

|- id="2000 RJ12" bgcolor=#FFC2E0
| 4 ||  || AMO || 22.3 || data-sort-value="0.12" | 120 m || single || 91 days || 01 Dec 2000 || 57 || align=left | Disc.: LINEAR || 
|- id="2000 RK12" bgcolor=#FFC2E0
| – ||  || APO || 21.3 || data-sort-value="0.20" | 200 m || single || 4 days || 05 Sep 2000 || 25 || align=left | Disc.: LINEAR || 
|- id="2000 RN12" bgcolor=#FFC2E0
| 1 ||  || APO || 20.0 || data-sort-value="0.36" | 360 m || multiple || 2000–2008 || 13 Mar 2008 || 58 || align=left | Disc.: LINEAR || 
|- id="2000 RR13" bgcolor=#FA8072
| 0 ||  || MCA || 17.77 || data-sort-value="0.83" | 830 m || multiple || 2000–2021 || 27 Dec 2021 || 113 || align=left | Disc.: LINEAR || 
|- id="2000 RC37" bgcolor=#E9E9E9
| – ||  || MBA-M || 17.6 || data-sort-value="0.90" | 900 m || single || 24 days || 27 Sep 2000 || 22 || align=left | Disc.: LINEAR || 
|- id="2000 RD52" bgcolor=#FFC2E0
| 5 ||  || AMO || 20.6 || data-sort-value="0.27" | 270 m || single || 90 days || 01 Dec 2000 || 22 || align=left | Disc.: LONEOS || 
|- id="2000 RE52" bgcolor=#FFC2E0
| 2 ||  || APO || 22.3 || data-sort-value="0.149" | 149 m || multiple || 2000–2010 || 15 Mar 2010 || 105 || align=left | Disc.: LINEARAlt.: 2010 EK2 || 
|- id="2000 RF52" bgcolor=#FFC2E0
| 5 ||  || AMO || 24.0 || data-sort-value="0.056" | 56 m || single || 87 days || 01 Dec 2000 || 39 || align=left | Disc.: LINEAR || 
|- id="2000 RP52" bgcolor=#FA8072
| 0 ||  || MCA || 17.13 || 1.6 km || multiple || 2000–2021 || 21 Dec 2021 || 304 || align=left | Disc.: LINEARAlt.: 2014 AJ46 || 
|- id="2000 RO53" bgcolor=#FA8072
| 0 ||  || MCA || 18.89 || data-sort-value="0.50" | 500 m || multiple || 2000–2021 || 28 Nov 2021 || 250 || align=left | Disc.: Spacewatch || 
|- id="2000 RU56" bgcolor=#E9E9E9
| 1 ||  || MBA-M || 16.8 || 2.4 km || multiple || 2000–2019 || 02 Dec 2019 || 117 || align=left | Disc.: SpacewatchAlt.: 2014 OD393 || 
|- id="2000 RB57" bgcolor=#C2FFFF
| 0 ||  || JT || 14.19 || 8.1 km || multiple || 2000–2021 || 29 Aug 2021 || 174 || align=left | Disc.: SpacewatchTrojan camp (L5)Alt.: 2010 HS || 
|- id="2000 RP57" bgcolor=#E9E9E9
| 0 ||  || MBA-M || 17.1 || 2.1 km || multiple || 2000–2019 || 28 Nov 2019 || 70 || align=left | Disc.: Spacewatch || 
|- id="2000 RP58" bgcolor=#E9E9E9
| 0 ||  || MBA-M || 17.60 || 1.3 km || multiple || 2000–2021 || 03 Dec 2021 || 120 || align=left | Disc.: Spacewatch || 
|- id="2000 RD59" bgcolor=#fefefe
| 0 ||  || MBA-I || 18.4 || data-sort-value="0.62" | 620 m || multiple || 2000–2021 || 17 Jan 2021 || 47 || align=left | Disc.: SpacewatchAlt.: 2008 VR99 || 
|- id="2000 RH59" bgcolor=#d6d6d6
| 0 ||  || MBA-O || 16.9 || 2.3 km || multiple || 2000–2021 || 11 Jun 2021 || 75 || align=left | Disc.: SpacewatchAlt.: 2006 UC325 || 
|- id="2000 RP59" bgcolor=#d6d6d6
| 0 ||  || MBA-O || 15.9 || 3.7 km || multiple || 2000–2019 || 03 Apr 2019 || 85 || align=left | Disc.: SpacewatchAlt.: 2010 AH38 || 
|- id="2000 RT59" bgcolor=#E9E9E9
| 0 ||  || MBA-M || 17.7 || 1.2 km || multiple || 2000–2019 || 08 Jan 2019 || 49 || align=left | Disc.: SpacewatchAlt.: 2004 PG70 || 
|- id="2000 RK60" bgcolor=#FFC2E0
| 6 ||  || AMO || 21.6 || data-sort-value="0.17" | 170 m || single || 28 days || 04 Oct 2000 || 69 || align=left | Disc.: LINEAR || 
|- id="2000 RG75" bgcolor=#FA8072
| 3 ||  || MCA || 18.4 || data-sort-value="0.62" | 620 m || multiple || 2000–2020 || 08 Dec 2020 || 224 || align=left | Disc.: LINEARAlt.: 2010 RE14 || 
|- id="2000 RQ76" bgcolor=#E9E9E9
| 0 ||  || MBA-M || 17.1 || 2.1 km || multiple || 2000–2019 || 28 Dec 2019 || 93 || align=left | Disc.: LINEARAlt.: 2014 SG263 || 
|- id="2000 RQ80" bgcolor=#fefefe
| 0 ||  || MBA-I || 17.8 || data-sort-value="0.82" | 820 m || multiple || 2000–2020 || 19 Jan 2020 || 208 || align=left | Disc.: LINEAR || 
|- id="2000 RH96" bgcolor=#E9E9E9
| 0 ||  || MBA-M || 17.55 || data-sort-value="0.92" | 920 m || multiple || 2000–2022 || 04 Jan 2022 || 97 || align=left | Disc.: AMOS || 
|- id="2000 RP106" bgcolor=#E9E9E9
| 0 ||  || MBA-M || 18.31 || data-sort-value="0.92" | 920 m || multiple || 2000–2021 || 01 Jul 2021 || 45 || align=left | Disc.: SDSSAdded on 17 June 2021Alt.: 2013 QJ37 || 
|- id="2000 RQ106" bgcolor=#d6d6d6
| 0 ||  || MBA-O || 17.19 || 2.0 km || multiple || 2000–2021 || 05 Dec 2021 || 101 || align=left | Disc.: SDSSAlt.: 2014 HJ186, 2015 RK211 || 
|- id="2000 RX106" bgcolor=#E9E9E9
| 1 ||  || MBA-M || 17.6 || data-sort-value="0.90" | 900 m || multiple || 2000–2020 || 16 Oct 2020 || 80 || align=left | Disc.: SDSS || 
|- id="2000 RY106" bgcolor=#d6d6d6
| 0 ||  || MBA-O || 16.35 || 3.0 km || multiple || 2000–2021 || 15 May 2021 || 89 || align=left | Disc.: SDSSAlt.: 2009 DH58 || 
|- id="2000 RZ106" bgcolor=#fefefe
| 1 ||  || MBA-I || 19.3 || data-sort-value="0.41" | 410 m || multiple || 2000–2021 || 05 Jun 2021 || 23 || align=left | Disc.: SDSSAdded on 21 August 2021Alt.: 2021 JS42 || 
|- id="2000 RE107" bgcolor=#d6d6d6
| 0 ||  || MBA-O || 17.9 || 1.5 km || multiple || 2000–2021 || 02 Oct 2021 || 42 || align=left | Disc.: SDSSAdded on 5 November 2021Alt.: 2016 TJ178 || 
|- id="2000 RH107" bgcolor=#fefefe
| 0 ||  || MBA-I || 18.1 || data-sort-value="0.71" | 710 m || multiple || 2000–2019 || 25 Sep 2019 || 27 || align=left | Disc.: SDSSAdded on 22 July 2020 || 
|- id="2000 RK107" bgcolor=#d6d6d6
| 0 ||  || MBA-O || 17.66 || 1.6 km || multiple || 2000–2021 || 13 May 2021 || 49 || align=left | Disc.: SDSSAdded on 17 June 2021Alt.: 2017 SS234 || 
|- id="2000 RZ107" bgcolor=#E9E9E9
| 0 ||  || MBA-M || 17.56 || 1.7 km || multiple || 2000–2021 || 15 Apr 2021 || 61 || align=left | Disc.: SDSS || 
|- id="2000 RB108" bgcolor=#C2FFFF
| 0 ||  || JT || 14.4 || 7.3 km || multiple || 2000–2020 || 24 Jun 2020 || 63 || align=left | Disc.: SDSSTrojan camp (L5) || 
|- id="2000 RC108" bgcolor=#E9E9E9
| 0 ||  || MBA-M || 17.84 || data-sort-value="0.80" | 800 m || multiple || 2000–2022 || 07 Jan 2022 || 158 || align=left | Disc.: Spacewatch || 
|- id="2000 RD108" bgcolor=#d6d6d6
| 0 ||  || MBA-O || 16.9 || 2.3 km || multiple || 2000–2021 || 16 Jan 2021 || 125 || align=left | Disc.: SDSS || 
|- id="2000 RE108" bgcolor=#d6d6d6
| 0 ||  || MBA-O || 16.1 || 3.4 km || multiple || 2000–2021 || 07 Jun 2021 || 110 || align=left | Disc.: SDSS || 
|- id="2000 RF108" bgcolor=#fefefe
| 0 ||  || MBA-I || 18.1 || data-sort-value="0.71" | 710 m || multiple || 2000–2021 || 05 Jan 2021 || 85 || align=left | Disc.: SDSS || 
|- id="2000 RG108" bgcolor=#E9E9E9
| 0 ||  || MBA-M || 17.11 || 1.1 km || multiple || 1996–2021 || 27 Nov 2021 || 194 || align=left | Disc.: LONEOSAlt.: 2004 RZ137 || 
|- id="2000 RJ108" bgcolor=#C2FFFF
| 0 ||  || JT || 14.42 || 7.3 km || multiple || 2000–2021 || 28 Jul 2021 || 93 || align=left | Disc.: SDSSTrojan camp (L5) || 
|- id="2000 RL108" bgcolor=#d6d6d6
| 0 ||  || MBA-O || 16.52 || 2.8 km || multiple || 2000–2021 || 08 Jul 2021 || 102 || align=left | Disc.: SDSS || 
|- id="2000 RM108" bgcolor=#E9E9E9
| 0 ||  || MBA-M || 17.73 || data-sort-value="0.85" | 850 m || multiple || 2000–2022 || 12 Jan 2022 || 77 || align=left | Disc.: Spacewatch || 
|- id="2000 RN108" bgcolor=#E9E9E9
| 0 ||  || MBA-M || 16.85 || 1.3 km || multiple || 2000–2021 || 09 Dec 2021 || 119 || align=left | Disc.: SDSS || 
|- id="2000 RO108" bgcolor=#fefefe
| 0 ||  || MBA-I || 18.1 || data-sort-value="0.71" | 710 m || multiple || 2000–2018 || 04 Jul 2018 || 54 || align=left | Disc.: SDSS || 
|- id="2000 RQ108" bgcolor=#d6d6d6
| 0 ||  || MBA-O || 16.86 || 2.4 km || multiple || 2000–2021 || 07 Jul 2021 || 102 || align=left | Disc.: SDSS || 
|- id="2000 RR108" bgcolor=#fefefe
| 0 ||  || MBA-I || 18.93 || data-sort-value="0.49" | 490 m || multiple || 1994–2021 || 09 Apr 2021 || 98 || align=left | Disc.: SDSS || 
|- id="2000 RT108" bgcolor=#d6d6d6
| 0 ||  || MBA-O || 17.32 || 1.9 km || multiple || 2000–2021 || 04 Oct 2021 || 78 || align=left | Disc.: SDSS || 
|- id="2000 RU108" bgcolor=#E9E9E9
| 0 ||  || MBA-M || 17.5 || 1.8 km || multiple || 1996–2019 || 19 Dec 2019 || 83 || align=left | Disc.: SDSS || 
|- id="2000 RW108" bgcolor=#fefefe
| 0 ||  || MBA-I || 18.1 || data-sort-value="0.71" | 710 m || multiple || 2000–2019 || 05 Nov 2019 || 59 || align=left | Disc.: Spacewatch || 
|- id="2000 RZ108" bgcolor=#E9E9E9
| 0 ||  || MBA-M || 17.84 || 1.5 km || multiple || 2000–2021 || 08 Apr 2021 || 72 || align=left | Disc.: SDSS || 
|- id="2000 RB109" bgcolor=#d6d6d6
| 0 ||  || MBA-O || 17.8 || 1.5 km || multiple || 2000–2018 || 13 Jan 2018 || 55 || align=left | Disc.: SDSS || 
|- id="2000 RC109" bgcolor=#E9E9E9
| 0 ||  || MBA-M || 17.3 || 1.9 km || multiple || 2000–2018 || 06 Oct 2018 || 49 || align=left | Disc.: Spacewatch || 
|- id="2000 RE109" bgcolor=#d6d6d6
| 0 ||  || MBA-O || 16.9 || 2.3 km || multiple || 2000–2020 || 23 Apr 2020 || 63 || align=left | Disc.: SDSS || 
|- id="2000 RF109" bgcolor=#E9E9E9
| 0 ||  || MBA-M || 17.63 || 1.7 km || multiple || 2000–2021 || 08 May 2021 || 98 || align=left | Disc.: SDSSAlt.: 2018 RW8 || 
|- id="2000 RK109" bgcolor=#fefefe
| 0 ||  || MBA-I || 18.7 || data-sort-value="0.54" | 540 m || multiple || 2000–2021 || 06 Jan 2021 || 112 || align=left | Disc.: SDSS || 
|- id="2000 RL109" bgcolor=#E9E9E9
| 0 ||  || MBA-M || 18.07 || data-sort-value="0.72" | 720 m || multiple || 1996–2021 || 24 Nov 2021 || 92 || align=left | Disc.: SDSSAlt.: 2010 EJ184 || 
|- id="2000 RM109" bgcolor=#d6d6d6
| 0 ||  || MBA-O || 16.9 || 2.3 km || multiple || 2000–2020 || 21 Apr 2020 || 43 || align=left | Disc.: SDSS || 
|- id="2000 RN109" bgcolor=#E9E9E9
| 0 ||  || MBA-M || 17.3 || 1.9 km || multiple || 2000–2020 || 23 Jan 2020 || 51 || align=left | Disc.: Spacewatch || 
|- id="2000 RO109" bgcolor=#fefefe
| 0 ||  || MBA-I || 19.30 || data-sort-value="0.41" | 410 m || multiple || 2000–2022 || 26 Jan 2022 || 51 || align=left | Disc.: Spacewatch || 
|- id="2000 RP109" bgcolor=#E9E9E9
| 0 ||  || MBA-M || 17.4 || 1.4 km || multiple || 2000–2020 || 27 Feb 2020 || 59 || align=left | Disc.: SDSS || 
|- id="2000 RQ109" bgcolor=#E9E9E9
| 0 ||  || MBA-M || 18.10 || data-sort-value="0.71" | 710 m || multiple || 2000–2021 || 25 Nov 2021 || 92 || align=left | Disc.: SDSS || 
|- id="2000 RR109" bgcolor=#d6d6d6
| 0 ||  || MBA-O || 16.3 || 3.1 km || multiple || 2000–2020 || 26 May 2020 || 77 || align=left | Disc.: SDSS || 
|- id="2000 RS109" bgcolor=#fefefe
| 0 ||  || MBA-I || 19.1 || data-sort-value="0.45" | 450 m || multiple || 2000–2020 || 17 Jul 2020 || 43 || align=left | Disc.: SDSS || 
|- id="2000 RT109" bgcolor=#fefefe
| 0 ||  || MBA-I || 18.7 || data-sort-value="0.54" | 540 m || multiple || 2000–2020 || 25 Jan 2020 || 46 || align=left | Disc.: SDSSAlt.: 2009 AX38 || 
|- id="2000 RV109" bgcolor=#d6d6d6
| 0 ||  || MBA-O || 16.8 || 2.4 km || multiple || 2000–2017 || 11 Oct 2017 || 37 || align=left | Disc.: Spacewatch || 
|- id="2000 RX109" bgcolor=#E9E9E9
| 0 ||  = (619212) || MBA-M || 17.4 || 1.4 km || multiple || 2000–2020 || 27 Feb 2020 || 46 || align=left | Disc.: SDSS || 
|- id="2000 RY109" bgcolor=#E9E9E9
| 0 ||  || MBA-M || 17.57 || 1.3 km || multiple || 2000–2021 || 08 Aug 2021 || 59 || align=left | Disc.: SDSS || 
|- id="2000 RZ109" bgcolor=#E9E9E9
| 0 ||  || MBA-M || 17.8 || 1.2 km || multiple || 2000–2017 || 11 Oct 2017 || 43 || align=left | Disc.: SDSS || 
|- id="2000 RA110" bgcolor=#fefefe
| 0 ||  || MBA-I || 18.4 || data-sort-value="0.62" | 620 m || multiple || 2000–2019 || 03 Oct 2019 || 56 || align=left | Disc.: SDSS || 
|- id="2000 RC110" bgcolor=#E9E9E9
| 0 ||  || MBA-M || 17.7 || 1.2 km || multiple || 2000–2018 || 30 Sep 2018 || 32 || align=left | Disc.: SDSS || 
|- id="2000 RD110" bgcolor=#fefefe
| 0 ||  || MBA-I || 18.53 || data-sort-value="0.58" | 580 m || multiple || 2000–2022 || 07 Jan 2022 || 44 || align=left | Disc.: SDSS || 
|- id="2000 RE110" bgcolor=#E9E9E9
| 0 ||  || MBA-M || 18.02 || 1.0 km || multiple || 2000–2021 || 15 May 2021 || 43 || align=left | Disc.: SDSS || 
|- id="2000 RF110" bgcolor=#d6d6d6
| 0 ||  || MBA-O || 17.8 || 1.5 km || multiple || 2000–2019 || 03 Jan 2019 || 28 || align=left | Disc.: SDSS || 
|- id="2000 RG110" bgcolor=#fefefe
| 0 ||  || MBA-I || 18.6 || data-sort-value="0.57" | 570 m || multiple || 2000–2019 || 28 Oct 2019 || 66 || align=left | Disc.: Spacewatch || 
|- id="2000 RH110" bgcolor=#fefefe
| 0 ||  || MBA-I || 18.5 || data-sort-value="0.59" | 590 m || multiple || 2000–2020 || 20 Oct 2020 || 46 || align=left | Disc.: SDSS || 
|- id="2000 RJ110" bgcolor=#fefefe
| 0 ||  || MBA-I || 18.3 || data-sort-value="0.65" | 650 m || multiple || 2000–2019 || 22 Oct 2019 || 55 || align=left | Disc.: Spacewatch || 
|- id="2000 RK110" bgcolor=#E9E9E9
| 0 ||  || MBA-M || 18.11 || 1.0 km || multiple || 2000–2021 || 30 Jun 2021 || 43 || align=left | Disc.: SDSS || 
|- id="2000 RL110" bgcolor=#fefefe
| 0 ||  || MBA-I || 18.1 || data-sort-value="0.71" | 710 m || multiple || 2000–2020 || 25 Jan 2020 || 31 || align=left | Disc.: SDSS || 
|- id="2000 RM110" bgcolor=#E9E9E9
| 0 ||  || MBA-M || 17.71 || data-sort-value="0.85" | 850 m || multiple || 2000–2021 || 31 Oct 2021 || 82 || align=left | Disc.: SDSS || 
|- id="2000 RN110" bgcolor=#fefefe
| 0 ||  || MBA-I || 18.1 || data-sort-value="0.71" | 710 m || multiple || 2000–2019 || 29 Nov 2019 || 88 || align=left | Disc.: SDSS || 
|- id="2000 RO110" bgcolor=#fefefe
| 0 ||  || MBA-I || 18.6 || data-sort-value="0.57" | 570 m || multiple || 2000–2020 || 22 Oct 2020 || 72 || align=left | Disc.: SDSS || 
|- id="2000 RP110" bgcolor=#E9E9E9
| 0 ||  || MBA-M || 17.5 || 1.8 km || multiple || 2000–2019 || 20 Dec 2019 || 75 || align=left | Disc.: SDSS || 
|- id="2000 RQ110" bgcolor=#fefefe
| 0 ||  || MBA-I || 17.7 || data-sort-value="0.86" | 860 m || multiple || 2000–2021 || 22 Jan 2021 || 100 || align=left | Disc.: Spacewatch || 
|- id="2000 RR110" bgcolor=#fefefe
| 0 ||  || MBA-I || 18.1 || data-sort-value="0.71" | 710 m || multiple || 2000–2020 || 14 Nov 2020 || 61 || align=left | Disc.: SDSS || 
|- id="2000 RS110" bgcolor=#fefefe
| 0 ||  || MBA-I || 18.2 || data-sort-value="0.68" | 680 m || multiple || 2000–2018 || 15 Sep 2018 || 51 || align=left | Disc.: SDSS || 
|- id="2000 RT110" bgcolor=#d6d6d6
| 0 ||  || MBA-O || 17.2 || 2.0 km || multiple || 2000–2020 || 19 Nov 2020 || 55 || align=left | Disc.: SDSS || 
|- id="2000 RU110" bgcolor=#E9E9E9
| 0 ||  || MBA-M || 17.2 || 2.0 km || multiple || 2000–2018 || 06 Oct 2018 || 58 || align=left | Disc.: SDSS || 
|- id="2000 RV110" bgcolor=#fefefe
| 0 ||  || MBA-I || 17.86 || data-sort-value="0.80" | 800 m || multiple || 2000–2022 || 27 Jan 2022 || 88 || align=left | Disc.: SDSS || 
|- id="2000 RW110" bgcolor=#fefefe
| 0 ||  || MBA-I || 17.7 || data-sort-value="0.86" | 860 m || multiple || 2000–2021 || 18 Jan 2021 || 60 || align=left | Disc.: SDSS || 
|- id="2000 RY110" bgcolor=#E9E9E9
| 0 ||  || MBA-M || 17.2 || 2.0 km || multiple || 2000–2021 || 18 Jan 2021 || 61 || align=left | Disc.: Spacewatch || 
|- id="2000 RZ110" bgcolor=#d6d6d6
| 0 ||  || MBA-O || 17.21 || 2.0 km || multiple || 2000–2019 || 09 Feb 2019 || 57 || align=left | Disc.: SDSS || 
|- id="2000 RA111" bgcolor=#fefefe
| 0 ||  || MBA-I || 18.5 || data-sort-value="0.59" | 590 m || multiple || 2000–2019 || 07 Jan 2019 || 50 || align=left | Disc.: SDSS || 
|- id="2000 RC111" bgcolor=#d6d6d6
| 0 ||  || MBA-O || 16.44 || 2.9 km || multiple || 2000–2021 || 09 May 2021 || 75 || align=left | Disc.: SDSS || 
|- id="2000 RD111" bgcolor=#E9E9E9
| 0 ||  || MBA-M || 17.84 || data-sort-value="0.80" | 800 m || multiple || 2000–2021 || 09 Nov 2021 || 86 || align=left | Disc.: SDSS || 
|- id="2000 RE111" bgcolor=#E9E9E9
| 0 ||  || MBA-M || 17.91 || 1.1 km || multiple || 2000–2021 || 07 Apr 2021 || 48 || align=left | Disc.: Spacewatch || 
|- id="2000 RG111" bgcolor=#fefefe
| 1 ||  || MBA-I || 18.5 || data-sort-value="0.59" | 590 m || multiple || 2000–2020 || 29 Feb 2020 || 42 || align=left | Disc.: SDSS || 
|- id="2000 RH111" bgcolor=#fefefe
| 0 ||  || MBA-I || 18.5 || data-sort-value="0.59" | 590 m || multiple || 2000–2019 || 19 Dec 2019 || 46 || align=left | Disc.: SDSSAlt.: 2013 ED130 || 
|- id="2000 RJ111" bgcolor=#d6d6d6
| 0 ||  || MBA-O || 16.9 || 2.3 km || multiple || 2000–2020 || 20 Apr 2020 || 54 || align=left | Disc.: Spacewatch || 
|- id="2000 RK111" bgcolor=#E9E9E9
| 0 ||  || MBA-M || 17.4 || 1.8 km || multiple || 2000–2021 || 12 Jan 2021 || 45 || align=left | Disc.: SDSS || 
|- id="2000 RL111" bgcolor=#E9E9E9
| 0 ||  || MBA-M || 18.4 || 1.2 km || multiple || 2000–2019 || 02 Nov 2019 || 41 || align=left | Disc.: SDSS || 
|- id="2000 RM111" bgcolor=#E9E9E9
| 0 ||  || MBA-M || 17.8 || 1.2 km || multiple || 2000–2019 || 10 Jan 2019 || 47 || align=left | Disc.: SDSS || 
|- id="2000 RN111" bgcolor=#d6d6d6
| 0 ||  || MBA-O || 16.6 || 2.7 km || multiple || 2000–2020 || 16 Mar 2020 || 52 || align=left | Disc.: Spacewatch || 
|- id="2000 RO111" bgcolor=#E9E9E9
| 2 ||  || MBA-M || 17.9 || data-sort-value="0.78" | 780 m || multiple || 2000–2020 || 15 Sep 2020 || 80 || align=left | Disc.: SDSS || 
|- id="2000 RP111" bgcolor=#E9E9E9
| 0 ||  || MBA-M || 17.4 || 1.4 km || multiple || 2000–2020 || 27 Feb 2020 || 50 || align=left | Disc.: SDSS || 
|- id="2000 RQ111" bgcolor=#fefefe
| 0 ||  || MBA-I || 19.07 || data-sort-value="0.46" | 460 m || multiple || 2000–2021 || 10 May 2021 || 52 || align=left | Disc.: SDSS || 
|- id="2000 RR111" bgcolor=#fefefe
| 1 ||  || MBA-I || 18.8 || data-sort-value="0.52" | 520 m || multiple || 2000–2018 || 02 Nov 2018 || 31 || align=left | Disc.: SDSS || 
|- id="2000 RS111" bgcolor=#FA8072
| 1 ||  || MCA || 18.60 || data-sort-value="0.57" | 570 m || multiple || 2000–2022 || 27 Jan 2022 || 48 || align=left | Disc.: SDSS || 
|- id="2000 RT111" bgcolor=#E9E9E9
| 0 ||  || MBA-M || 17.71 || data-sort-value="0.85" | 850 m || multiple || 2000–2021 || 27 Oct 2021 || 47 || align=left | Disc.: SDSS || 
|- id="2000 RU111" bgcolor=#E9E9E9
| 0 ||  || MBA-M || 18.25 || data-sort-value="0.94" | 940 m || multiple || 2000–2021 || 27 Nov 2021 || 54 || align=left | Disc.: SDSS || 
|- id="2000 RV111" bgcolor=#d6d6d6
| 1 ||  || MBA-O || 18.1 || 1.3 km || multiple || 2000–2019 || 29 Aug 2019 || 104 || align=left | Disc.: SDSS || 
|- id="2000 RW111" bgcolor=#E9E9E9
| 0 ||  || MBA-M || 17.4 || 1.8 km || multiple || 2000–2019 || 03 Dec 2019 || 58 || align=left | Disc.: SDSS || 
|- id="2000 RX111" bgcolor=#fefefe
| 0 ||  || MBA-I || 18.8 || data-sort-value="0.52" | 520 m || multiple || 2000–2021 || 16 Jan 2021 || 62 || align=left | Disc.: SDSS || 
|- id="2000 RY111" bgcolor=#E9E9E9
| 0 ||  || MBA-M || 17.5 || 1.8 km || multiple || 2000–2021 || 15 Jan 2021 || 57 || align=left | Disc.: Spacewatch || 
|- id="2000 RB112" bgcolor=#d6d6d6
| 0 ||  || MBA-O || 17.07 || 2.1 km || multiple || 2000–2021 || 06 Nov 2021 || 61 || align=left | Disc.: SDSS || 
|- id="2000 RC112" bgcolor=#fefefe
| 0 ||  || MBA-I || 18.32 || data-sort-value="0.64" | 640 m || multiple || 2000–2021 || 09 Nov 2021 || 74 || align=left | Disc.: SDSS || 
|- id="2000 RD112" bgcolor=#E9E9E9
| 0 ||  || MBA-M || 17.64 || data-sort-value="0.88" | 880 m || multiple || 2000–2021 || 01 Dec 2021 || 51 || align=left | Disc.: SDSS || 
|- id="2000 RE112" bgcolor=#fefefe
| 0 ||  || MBA-I || 18.98 || data-sort-value="0.48" | 480 m || multiple || 2000–2021 || 14 Apr 2021 || 30 || align=left | Disc.: SDSS || 
|- id="2000 RF112" bgcolor=#E9E9E9
| 0 ||  || MBA-M || 17.3 || 1.9 km || multiple || 2000–2019 || 29 Sep 2019 || 52 || align=left | Disc.: SDSS || 
|- id="2000 RG112" bgcolor=#fefefe
| 0 ||  || MBA-I || 18.5 || data-sort-value="0.59" | 590 m || multiple || 2000–2018 || 08 Nov 2018 || 41 || align=left | Disc.: SDSS || 
|- id="2000 RH112" bgcolor=#d6d6d6
| 0 ||  || MBA-O || 16.72 || 2.5 km || multiple || 1995–2021 || 05 Oct 2021 || 71 || align=left | Disc.: SDSS || 
|- id="2000 RJ112" bgcolor=#d6d6d6
| 0 ||  || MBA-O || 16.9 || 2.3 km || multiple || 2000–2021 || 08 Jun 2021 || 46 || align=left | Disc.: SDSS || 
|- id="2000 RK112" bgcolor=#d6d6d6
| 0 ||  || MBA-O || 17.5 || 1.8 km || multiple || 2000–2020 || 11 Dec 2020 || 71 || align=left | Disc.: SDSSAlt.: 2013 HU91 || 
|- id="2000 RL112" bgcolor=#d6d6d6
| 1 ||  || MBA-O || 17.4 || 1.8 km || multiple || 2000–2017 || 26 Oct 2017 || 22 || align=left | Disc.: SDSS || 
|- id="2000 RM112" bgcolor=#fefefe
| 0 ||  || MBA-I || 18.7 || data-sort-value="0.54" | 540 m || multiple || 2000–2016 || 08 Aug 2016 || 34 || align=left | Disc.: SDSS || 
|- id="2000 RN112" bgcolor=#d6d6d6
| 0 ||  || MBA-O || 17.4 || 1.8 km || multiple || 2000–2017 || 10 Nov 2017 || 26 || align=left | Disc.: SDSS || 
|- id="2000 RO112" bgcolor=#C2FFFF
| 0 ||  || JT || 14.1 || 8.4 km || multiple || 2000–2020 || 26 May 2020 || 114 || align=left | Disc.: SpacewatchTrojan camp (L5)Alt.: 2010 GD45 || 
|- id="2000 RP112" bgcolor=#E9E9E9
| 0 ||  || MBA-M || 17.6 || 1.7 km || multiple || 2000–2019 || 26 Sep 2019 || 60 || align=left | Disc.: SDSS || 
|- id="2000 RQ112" bgcolor=#E9E9E9
| 0 ||  || MBA-M || 17.8 || 1.2 km || multiple || 2000–2021 || 12 Jun 2021 || 69 || align=left | Disc.: SDSS || 
|- id="2000 RR112" bgcolor=#E9E9E9
| 2 ||  || MBA-M || 18.0 || 1.4 km || multiple || 2000–2018 || 17 Nov 2018 || 45 || align=left | Disc.: Spacewatch || 
|- id="2000 RS112" bgcolor=#fefefe
| 0 ||  || MBA-I || 19.1 || data-sort-value="0.45" | 450 m || multiple || 2000–2018 || 07 Nov 2018 || 34 || align=left | Disc.: SDSS || 
|- id="2000 RT112" bgcolor=#fefefe
| 0 ||  || MBA-I || 17.93 || data-sort-value="0.77" | 770 m || multiple || 2000–2021 || 31 Oct 2021 || 74 || align=left | Disc.: SDSS || 
|- id="2000 RU112" bgcolor=#fefefe
| 1 ||  || MBA-I || 18.5 || data-sort-value="0.59" | 590 m || multiple || 2000–2019 || 03 Oct 2019 || 25 || align=left | Disc.: SDSS || 
|- id="2000 RV112" bgcolor=#d6d6d6
| 0 ||  || MBA-O || 16.4 || 2.9 km || multiple || 2000–2020 || 22 Apr 2020 || 92 || align=left | Disc.: SDSS || 
|- id="2000 RX112" bgcolor=#d6d6d6
| 0 ||  || MBA-O || 17.9 || 1.5 km || multiple || 2000–2017 || 26 Sep 2017 || 25 || align=left | Disc.: SDSSAdded on 19 October 2020 || 
|- id="2000 RZ112" bgcolor=#E9E9E9
| 0 ||  || MBA-M || 17.63 || data-sort-value="0.89" | 890 m || multiple || 2000–2021 || 08 Dec 2021 || 51 || align=left | Disc.: SpacewatchAdded on 17 January 2021 || 
|- id="2000 RA113" bgcolor=#fefefe
| 0 ||  || MBA-I || 19.2 || data-sort-value="0.43" | 430 m || multiple || 2000–2020 || 15 Sep 2020 || 38 || align=left | Disc.: SpacewatchAdded on 17 January 2021 || 
|- id="2000 RC113" bgcolor=#E9E9E9
| 1 ||  || MBA-M || 17.9 || data-sort-value="0.78" | 780 m || multiple || 2000–2020 || 10 Oct 2020 || 40 || align=left | Disc.: SDSSAdded on 9 March 2021 || 
|- id="2000 RD113" bgcolor=#E9E9E9
| 3 ||  || MBA-M || 17.6 || 1.7 km || multiple || 2000–2014 || 27 Nov 2014 || 22 || align=left | Disc.: SpacewatchAdded on 9 March 2021 || 
|- id="2000 RF113" bgcolor=#d6d6d6
| 2 ||  || MBA-O || 17.71 || 1.6 km || multiple || 2000–2022 || 20 Oct 2022 || 19 || align=left | Disc.: SDSSAdded on 24 December 2021 || 
|- id="2000 RG113" bgcolor=#d6d6d6
| 0 ||  || MBA-O || 17.48 || 1.8 km || multiple || 2000–2021 || 06 Oct 2021 || 50 || align=left | Disc.: SDSSAdded on 5 November 2021 || 
|- id="2000 RH113" bgcolor=#E9E9E9
| 0 ||  || MBA-M || 17.85 || data-sort-value="0.80" | 800 m || multiple || 2000–2021 || 31 Oct 2021 || 80 || align=left | Disc.: SpacewatchAdded on 5 November 2021 || 
|- id="2000 RJ113" bgcolor=#fefefe
| 0 ||  || MBA-I || 18.3 || data-sort-value="0.65" | 650 m || multiple || 2000–2021 || 18 Feb 2021 || 31 || align=left | Disc.: SDSSAdded on 5 November 2021 || 
|- id="2000 RK113" bgcolor=#fefefe
| 1 ||  || MBA-I || 18.97 || data-sort-value="0.48" | 480 m || multiple || 2000–2021 || 10 Nov 2021 || 48 || align=left | Disc.: SpacewatchAdded on 5 November 2021 || 
|- id="2000 RL113" bgcolor=#E9E9E9
| 0 ||  || MBA-M || 19.26 || data-sort-value="0.42" | 420 m || multiple || 2000–2021 || 29 Nov 2021 || 37 || align=left | Disc.: SDSSAdded on 24 December 2021 || 
|- id="2000 RM113" bgcolor=#fefefe
| 0 ||  || MBA-I || 18.8 || data-sort-value="0.52" | 520 m || multiple || 2000–2021 || 06 Nov 2021 || 28 || align=left | Disc.: SDSSAdded on 24 December 2021 || 
|}
back to top

References 
 

Lists of unnumbered minor planets